= Northeast China administrative division codes of the PRC (Division 2) =

List of administrative division codes of the PRC in Division 2 or Northeast China.

== Liaoning (21) ==
210000	Liaoning Province 辽宁省								
210100	Shenyang city 沈阳市								
210101	District 市辖区	210102	Heping 和平区	210103	Shenhe 沈河区	210104	Dadong 大东区	210105	Huanggu 皇姑区
210101	District 市辖区	210106	Tiexi 铁西区						
210101	District 市辖区			210111	Sujiatun 苏家屯区	210112	Hunnan 浑南区	210113	Shenbei 沈北新区
210101	District 市辖区	210114	Yuhong 于洪区	210115	Liaozhong 辽中区				
210101	District 市辖区					210120	~~Shi~~ 市区		
210121	~~Xinmin Co.~~ 新民县	210122	~~Liaozhong Co.~~ 辽中县	210123	Kangping Co. 康平县	210124	Faku Co. 法库县		
210181	Xinmin city 新民市								
210200	Dalian city 大连市								
210201	District 市辖区	210202	Zhongshan 中山区	210203	Xigang 西岗区	210204	Shahekou 沙河口区		
210201	District 市辖区			210211	Ganjingzi 甘井子区	210212	Lüshunkou 旅顺口区	210213	Jinzhou 金州区
210201	District 市辖区	210214	Pulandian 普兰店区						
210201	District 市辖区			210219	~~Wafangdian city~~ 瓦房店市	210220	~~Shi~~ 市区		
210221	~~Jin Co.~~ 金县	210222	~~Xinjin Co.~~ 新金县	210223	~~Fu Co.~~ 复县	210224	Changhai Co. 长海县	210225	~~Zhuanghe Co.~~ 庄河县
210281	Wafangdian city 瓦房店市	210282	~~Pulandian city~~ 普兰店市	210283	Zhuanghe city 庄河市				
210300	Anshan city 鞍山市								
210301	District 市辖区	210302	Tiedong 铁东区	210303	Tiexi 铁西区	210304	Lishan 立山区		
210301	District 市辖区			210311	Qianshan 千山区				
210301	District 市辖区			210319	~~Haicheng city~~ 海城市	210320	~~Shi~~ 市区		
210321	Tai'an Co. 台安县	210322	~~Haicheng Co.~~ 海城县	210323	Xiuyan Co. 岫岩县				
210381	Haicheng city 海城市								
210400	Fushun city 抚顺市								
210401	District 市辖区	210402	Xinfu 新抚区	210403	Dongzhou 东洲区	210404	Wanghua 望花区		
210401	District 市辖区			210411	Shuncheng 顺城区				
210401	District 市辖区					210420	~~Shi~~ 市区		
210421	Fushun Co. 抚顺县	210422	Xinbin Co. 新宾县	210423	Qingyuan Co. 清原县				
210500	Benxi city 本溪市								
210501	District 市辖区	210502	Pingshan 平山区	210503	Xihu 溪湖区	210504	Mingshan 明山区	210505	Nanfen 南芬区
210501	District 市辖区			210511	~~Lixin~~ 立新区				
210501	District 市辖区					210520	~~Shi~~ 市区		
210521	Benxi Co. 本溪县	210522	Huanren Co. 桓仁县						
210600	Dandong city 丹东市								
210601	District 市辖区	210602	Yuanbao 元宝区	210603	Zhenxing 振兴区	210604	Zhen'an 振安区		
210601	District 市辖区					210620	~~Shi~~ 市区		
210621	~~Fengcheng Co.~~ 凤城县	210622	~~Xiuyan Co.~~ 岫岩县	210623	~~Donggou Co.~~ 东沟县	210624	Kuandian Co. 宽甸县		
210681	Donggang city 东港市	210682	Fengcheng city 凤城市						
210700	Jinzhou city 锦州市								
210701	District 市辖区	210702	Guta 古塔区	210703	Linghe 凌河区	210704	~~Nanpiao~~ 南票区	210705	~~Huludao~~ 葫芦岛区
210701	District 市辖区			210711	Taihe 太和区				
210701	District 市辖区			210719	~~Jinxi city~~ 锦西市	210720	~~Shi~~ 市区		
210721	~~Jinxi Co.~~ 锦西县	210722	~~Xingcheng Co.~~ 兴城县	210723	~~Suizhong Co.~~ 绥中县	210724	~~Jin Co.~~ 锦县	210725	~~Beizhen Co.~~ 北镇县
210726	Heishan Co. 黑山县	210727	Yi Co. 义县						
210781	Linghai city 凌海市	210782	Beizhen city 北镇市						
210800	Yingkou city 营口市								
210801	District 市辖区	210802	Zhanqian 站前区	210803	Xishi 西市区	210804	Bayuquan 鲅鱼圈区		
210801	District 市辖区			210811	Laobian 老边区	210812	~~Bayuquan~~ 鲅鱼圈区		
210801	District 市辖区					210820	~~Shi~~ 市区		
210821	~~Yingkou Co.~~ 营口县	210822	~~Panshan Co.~~ 盘山县	210823	~~Dawa Co.~~ 大洼县	210824	~~Gai Co.~~ 盖县		
210881	Gaizhou city 盖州市	210882	Dashiqiao city 大石桥市						
210900	Fuxin city 阜新市								
210901	District 市辖区	210902	Haizhou 海州区	210903	Xinqiu 新邱区	210904	Taiping 太平区	210905	Qinghemen 清河门区
210901	District 市辖区			210911	Xihe 细河区				
210901	District 市辖区					210920	~~Shi~~ 市区		
210921	Fuxin Co. 阜新县	210922	Zhangwu Co. 彰武县						
211000	Liaoyang city 辽阳市								
211001	District 市辖区	211002	Baita 白塔区	211003	Wensheng 文圣区	211004	Hongwei 宏伟区	211005	Gongchangling 弓长岭区
211001	District 市辖区			211011	Taizihe 太子河区				
211001	District 市辖区					211020	~~Shi~~ 市区		
211021	Liaoyang Co. 辽阳县	211022	~~Dengta Co.~~ 灯塔县						
211081	Dengta city 灯塔市								
211100	Panjin city 盘锦市								
211101	District 市辖区	211102	Shuangtaizi 双台子区	211103	Xinglongtai 兴隆台区	211104	Dawa 大洼区		
211101	District 市辖区					211111	~~Jiao~~ 郊区		
211121	~~Dawa Co.~~ 大洼县	211122	Panshan Co. 盘山县						
211200	Tieling city 铁岭市								
211201	District 市辖区	211202	Yinzhou 银州区	211203	~~Tiefa~~ 铁法区	211204	Qinghe 清河区		
211221	Tieling Co. 铁岭县	211222	~~Kaiyuan Co.~~ 开原县	211223	Xifeng Co. 西丰县	211224	Changtu Co. 昌图县	211225	~~Kangping Co.~~ 康平县
211226	~~Faku~~ 法库县								
211281	Diaobingshan city 调兵山市	211282	Kaiyuan city 开原市						
211300	Chaoyang city 朝阳市								
211301	District 市辖区	211302	Shuangta 双塔区	211303	Longcheng 龙城区				
				211319	~~Beipiao city~~ 北票市				
211321	Chaoyang Co. 朝阳县	211322	Jianping Co. 建平县	211323	~~Lingyuan Co.~~ 凌源县	211324	Kalaqinzuoyi Co. 喀喇沁左翼县	211325	~~Jianchang Co.~~ 建昌县
211326	~~Beipiao Co.~~ 北票县								
211381	Beipiao city 北票市	211382	Lingyuan city 凌源市						
211400	Huludao city 葫芦岛市								
211401	District 市辖区	211402	Lianshan 连山区	211403	Longgang 龙港区	211404	Nanpiao 南票区		
211421	Suizhong Co. 绥中县	211422	Jianchang Co. 建昌县						
211481	Xingcheng city 兴城市								
212100	~~Tieling Prefecture~~ 铁岭地区								
212200	~~Chaoyang Prefecture~~ 朝阳地区								
212300	~~Panjin Prefecture~~ 盘锦地区								
212400	~~Juud League~~ 昭乌达盟								
219000	~~Direct administration~~ 省直辖								
219001	~~Wafangdian city~~ 瓦房店市	219002	~~Haicheng city~~ 海城市	219003	~~Jinxi city~~ 锦西市	219004	~~Xingcheng city~~ 兴城市	219005	~~Tiefa city~~ 铁法市
219006	~~Beipiao city~~ 北票市	219007	~~Kaiyuan city~~ 开原市	219008	~~Pulandian city~~ 普兰店市	219009	~~Lingyuan city~~ 凌源市	219010	~~Zhuanghe city~~ 庄河市
219011	~~Dashiqiao city~~ 大石桥市	219012	~~Gaizhou city~~ 盖州市	219013	~~Xinmin city~~ 新民市	219014	~~Donggang city~~ 东港市	219015	~~Linghai city~~ 凌海市
219016	~~Fengcheng city~~ 凤城市								

== Jilin (22) ==
220000	Jilin Province 吉林省								
220100	Changchun city 长春市								
220101	District 市辖区	220102	Nanguan 南关区	220103	Kuancheng 宽城区	220104	Chaoyang 朝阳区	220105	Erdao 二道区
220101	District 市辖区	220106	Lüyuan 绿园区						
220101	District 市辖区			220111	~~Jiao~~ 郊区	220112	Shuangyang 双阳区	220113	Jiutai 九台区
220101	District 市辖区					220120	~~Shi~~ 市区		
220121	~~Yushu Co.~~ 榆树县	220122	Nong'an Co. 农安县	220123	~~Jiutai Co.~~ 九台县	220124	~~Dehui Co.~~ 德惠县	220125	~~Shuangyang Co.~~ 双阳县
220181	~~Jiutai city~~ 九台市	220182	Yushu city 榆树市	220183	Dehui city 德惠市				
220200	Jilin city 吉林市								
220201	District 市辖区	220202	Changyi 昌邑区	220203	Longtan 龙潭区	220204	Chuanying 船营区	220205	~~Fengman~~ 丰满区
220201	District 市辖区			220211	Fengman 丰满区				
220201	District 市辖区					220220	~~Shi~~ 市区		
220221	Yongji Co. 永吉县	220222	~~Shulan Co.~~ 舒兰县	220223	~~Panshi Co.~~ 磐石县	220224	~~Jiaohe Co.~~ 蛟河县	220225	~~Huadian Co.~~ 桦甸县
220281	Jiaohe city 蛟河市	220282	Huadian city 桦甸市	220283	Shulan city 舒兰市	220284	Panshi city 磐石市		
220300	Siping city 四平市								
220301	District 市辖区	220302	Tiexi 铁西区	220303	Tiedong 铁东区				
220301	District 市辖区			220319	~~Gongzhuling city~~ 公主岭市				
220321	~~Huaide Co.~~ 怀德县	220322	Lishu Co. 梨树县	220323	Yitong Co. 伊通县	220324	~~Shuangliao Co.~~ 双辽县		
220381	Gongzhuling city 公主岭市	220382	Shuangliao city 双辽市						
220400	Liaoyuan city 辽源市								
220401	District 市辖区	220402	Longshan 龙山区	220403	Xi'an 西安区				
220421	Dongfeng Co. 东丰县	220422	Dongliao Co. 东辽县						
220500	Tonghua city 通化市								
220501	District 市辖区	220502	Dongchang 东昌区	220503	Erdaojiang 二道江区				
220501	District 市辖区			220519	~~Meihekou city~~ 梅河口市				
220521	Tonghua Co. 通化县	220522	~~Ji'an Co.~~ 集安县	220523	Huinan Co. 辉南县	220524	Liuhe Co. 柳河县		
220581	Meihekou city 梅河口市	220582	Ji'an city 集安市						
220600	Baishan city 白山市								
220601	District 市辖区	220602	Hunjiang 浑江区	220603	~~Sanchazi~~ 三岔子区	220604	~~Linjiang~~ 临江区	220605	Jiangyuan 江源区
220621	Fusong Co. 抚松县	220622	Jingyu Co. 靖宇县	220623	Changbai Co. 长白县	220624	~~Linjiang Co.~~ 临江县	220625	~~Jiangyuan Co.~~ 江源县
220681	Linjiang city 临江市								
220700	Songyuan city 松原市								
220701	District 市辖区	220702	Ningjiang 宁江区						
220721	Qianguo'erluosi Co. 前郭尔罗斯县	220722	Changling Co. 长岭县	220723	Qian'an Co. 乾安县	220724	~~Fuyu Co.~~ 扶余县		
220781	Fuyu city 扶余市								
220800	Baicheng city 白城市								
220801	District 市辖区	220802	Taobei 洮北区						
220821	Zhenlai Co. 镇赉县	220822	Tongyu Co. 通榆县						
220881	Taonan city 洮南市	220882	Da'an city 大安市						
222100	~~Siping Precture~~ 四平地区								
222200	~~Tonghua Precture~~ 通化地区								
222300	~~Baicheng Prefecture~~ 白城地区								
222400	Yanbian Prefecture 延边州								
222401	Yanji city 延吉市	222402	Tumen city 图们市	222403	Dunhua city 敦化市	222404	Hunchun city 珲春市	222405	Longjing city 龙井市
222406	Helong city 和龙市								
222421	~~Longjing Co.~~ 龙井县	222422	~~Dunhua Co.~~ 敦化县	222423	~~Longjing Co.~~ 和龙县	222424	Wangqing Co. 汪清县	222425	~~Hunchun Co.~~ 珲春县
222426	Antu Co. 安图县								
222500	~~Dehui Prefecture~~ 德惠地区								
222600	~~Yongji Precture~~ 永吉地区								
222700	~~Jirem League~~ 哲里木盟								
229000	~~Direct administration~~ 省直辖								
229001	~~Gongzhuling city~~ 公主岭市	229002	~~Meihekou city~~ 梅河口市	229003	~~Ji'an city~~ 集安市	229004	~~Huadian city~~ 桦甸市	229005	~~Jiutai city~~ 九台市
229006	~~Jiaohe city~~ 蛟河市	229007	~~Yushu city~~ 榆树市	229008	~~Shulan city~~ 舒兰市	229009	~~Da'an city~~ 大安市	229010	~~Taonan city~~ 洮南市
229011	~~Linjiang city~~ 临江市	229012	~~Dehui city~~ 德惠市						

== Heilongjiang (23) ==
230000	Heilongjiang Province 黑龙江省								
230100	Harbin city 哈尔滨市								
230101	District 市辖区	230102	Daoli 道里区	230103	Nangang 南岗区	230104	Daowai 道外区	230105	~~Taiping~~ 太平区
230101	District 市辖区	230106	~~Xiangfang~~ 香坊区	230107	~~Dongli~~ 动力区	230108	Pingfang 平房区	230109	Songbei 松北区
230101	District 市辖区	230110	Xiangfang 香坊区	230111	Hulan 呼兰区	230112	Acheng 阿城区	230113	Shuangcheng 双城区
230121	~~Hulan Co.~~ 呼兰县	230122	~~Acheng Co.~~ 阿城县	230123	Yilan Co. 依兰县	230124	Fangzheng Co. 方正县	230125	Bin Co. 宾县
230126	Bayan Co. 巴彦县	230127	Mulan Co. 木兰县	230128	Tonghe Co. 通河县	230129	Yanshou Co. 延寿县		
230181	~~Acheng city~~ 阿城市	230182	~~Shuangcheng city~~ 双城市	230183	Shangzhi city 尚志市	230184	Wuchang city 五常市		
230200	Qiqihar city 齐齐哈尔市								
230201	District 市辖区	230202	Longsha 龙沙区	230203	Jianhua 建华区	230204	Tiefeng 铁锋区	230205	Ang'angxi 昂昂溪区
230201	District 市辖区	230206	Fularji 富拉尔基区	230207	Nianzishan 碾子山区	230208	Meilisi 梅里斯区		
230221	Longjiang Co. 龙江县	230222	~~Hehe Co.~~ 讷河县	230223	Yi'an Co. 依安县	230224	Tailai Co. 泰来县	230225	Gannan Co. 甘南县
230226	~~Du'erbote Co.~~ 杜尔伯特县	230227	Fuyu Co. 富裕县	230228	~~Lindian Co.~~ 林甸县	230229	Keshan Co. 克山县	230230	Kedong Co. 克东县
230231	Baiquan Co. 拜泉县								
230281	Nehe city 讷河市								
230300	Jixi city 鸡西市								
230301	District 市辖区	230302	Jiguan 鸡冠区	230303	Hengshan 恒山区	230304	Didao 滴道区	230305	Lishu 梨树区
230301	District 市辖区	230306	Chengzihe 城子河区	230307	Mashan 麻山区				
230321	Jidong Co. 鸡东县	230322	~~Hulin Co.~~ 虎林县						
230381	Hulin city 虎林市	230382	Mishan city 密山市						
230400	Hegang city 鹤岗市								
230401	District 市辖区	230402	Xiangyang 向阳区	230403	Gongnong 工农区	230404	Nanshan 南山区	230405	Xing'an 兴安区
230401	District 市辖区			230406	Dongshan 东山区	230407	Xingshan 兴山区		
230421	Luobei Co. 萝北县	230422	Suibin Co. 绥滨县						
230500	Shuangyashan city 双鸭山市								
230501	District 市辖区	230502	Jianshan 尖山区	230503	Lingdong 岭东区	230504	~~Lingxi~~ 岭西区	230505	Sifangtai 四方台区
230501	District 市辖区			230506	Baoshan 宝山区				
230521	Jixian Co. 集贤县	230522	Youyi Co. 友谊县	230523	Baoqing Co. 宝清县	230524	Raohe Co. 饶河县		
230600	Daqing city 大庆市								
230601	District 市辖区	230602	Sartu 萨尔图区	230603	Longfeng 龙凤区	230604	Ranghulu 让胡路区	230605	Honggang 红岗区
230601	District 市辖区	230606	Datong 大同区						
230621	Zhaozhou Co. 肇州县	230622	Zhaoyuan Co. 肇源县	230623	Lindian Co. 林甸县	230624	Du'erbote Co. 杜尔伯特县		
230700	Yichun city 伊春市								
230701	District 市辖区	230702	Yichun 伊春区	230703	Nancha 南岔区	230704	Youhao 友好区	230705	Xilin 西林区
230701	District 市辖区	230706	Cuiluan 翠峦区	230707	Xinqing 新青区	230708	Meixi 美溪区	230709	Jinshantun 金山屯区
230701	District 市辖区	230710	Wuying 五营区	230711	Wumahe 乌马河区	230712	Tangwanghe 汤旺河区	230713	Dailing 带岭区
230701	District 市辖区	230714	Wuyiling 乌伊岭区	230715	Hongxing 红星区	230716	Shangganling 上甘岭区		
230701	District 市辖区					230720	~~Shi~~ 市区		
230721	~~Tieli Co.~~ 铁力县	230722	Jiayin Co. 嘉荫县						
230781	Tieli city 铁力市								
230800	Jiamusi city 佳木斯市								
230801	District 市辖区	230802	~~Yonghong~~ 永红区	230803	Xiangyang 向阳区	230804	Qianjin 前进区	230805	Dongfeng 东风区
230801	District 市辖区			230811	Jiao 郊区				
230821	~~Fujin Co.~~ 富锦县	230822	Huanan Co. 桦南县	230823	~~Yilan Co.~~ 依兰县	230824	~~Boli Co.~~ 勃利县	230825	~~Jixian Co.~~ 集贤县
230826	Huachuan Co. 桦川县	230827	~~Baoqing Co.~~ 宝清县	230828	Tangyuan Co. 汤原县	230829	~~Suibin Co.~~ 绥滨县	230830	~~Luobei Co.~~ 萝北县
230831	~~Tongjiang Co.~~ 同江县	230832	~~Raohe Co.~~ 饶河县	230833	~~Fuyuan Co.~~ 抚远县	230834	~~Youyi Co.~~ 友谊县		
230881	Tongjiang city 同江市	230882	Fujin city 富锦市	230883	Fuyuan city 抚远市				
230900	Qitaihe city 七台河市								
230901	District 市辖区	230202	Xinxing 新兴区	230903	Taoshan 桃山区	230904	Qiezihe 茄子河区		
230921	Boli Co. 勃利县								
231000	Mudanjiang city 牡丹江市								
231001	District 市辖区	231002	Dong'an 东安区	231003	Yangming 阳明区	231004	Aimin 爱民区	231005	Xi'an 西安区
231001	District 市辖区			231011	~~Jiao~~ 郊区				
				231019	~~Jingpohu city~~ 镜泊湖市	231020	~~Suifenhe city~~ 绥芬河市		
231021	~~Ning'an Co.~~ 宁安县	231022	~~Hailin Co.~~ 海林县	231023	~~Muling Co.~~ 穆棱县	231024	~~Dongning Co.~~ 东宁县	231025	Linkou Co. 林口县
231026	~~Mishan Co.~~ 密山县	231027	~~Hulin Co.~~ 虎林县						
231081	Suifenhe city 绥芬河市	231082	~~Mishan city~~ 密山市	231083	Hulin city 海林市	231084	Ning'an city 宁安市	231085	Muling city 穆棱市
231086	Dongning city 东宁市								
231100	Heihe city 黑河市								
231101	District 市辖区	231102	Aihui 爱辉区						
231121	Nenjiang Co. 嫩江县	231122	~~Dedu Co.~~ 德都县	231123	Xunke Co. 逊克县	231124	Sunwu Co. 孙吴县		
231181	Bei'an city 北安市	231182	Wudalianchi city 五大连池市						
231200	Suihua city 绥化市								
231201	District 市辖区	231202	Beilin 北林区						
231221	Wangkui Co. 望奎县	231222	Lanxi Co. 兰西县	231223	Qinggang Co. 青冈县	231224	Qing'an Co. 庆安县	231225	Mingshui Co. 明水县
231226	Suiling Co. 绥棱县								
231281	Anda city 安达市	231282	Zhaodong city 肇东市	231283	Hailun city 海伦市				
232100	~~Songhuajiang Prefecture~~ 松花江地区								
232200	~~Nenjiang Prefecture~~ 嫩江地区								
232300	~~Suihua Prefecture~~ 绥化地区								
232400	~~Hejiang Prefecture~~ 合江地区								
232500	~~Mudanjiang Prefecture~~ 牡丹江地区								
232600	~~Heihe Prefecture~~ 黑河地区								
232700	Daxing'anling Prefecture 大兴安岭地区								
232701	Jiagedaqi 加格达奇区	232702	Songling 松岭区	232703	Xinlin 新林区	232704	Huzhong 呼中区	232705	Mohe city 漠河市
232721	Huma Co. 呼玛县	232722	Tahe Co. 塔河县	232723	~~Mohe Co.~~ 漠河县	232724	~~Mohe Co.~~ 漠河县		
232800	~~Yichun Prefecture~~ 伊春地区								
232900	~~Hulunbuir League~~ 呼伦贝尔盟								
239000	~~Direct administration~~ 省直辖								
239001	~~Suifenhe city~~ 绥芬河市	239002	~~Acheng city~~ 阿城市	239003	~~Tongjiang city~~ 同江市	239004	~~Fujin city~~ 富锦市	239005	~~Tieli city~~ 铁力市
239006	~~Mishan city~~ 密山市	239007	~~Hulin city~~ 海林市	239008	~~Nehe city~~ 讷河市	239009	~~Bei'an city~~ 北安市	239010	~~Wudalianchi city~~ 五大连池市
239011	~~Ning'an city~~ 宁安市								
