= List of administrative divisions of Liaoning =

Overview of the administrative divisions of Liaoning

Liaoning Province
- Capital: Shenyang

Prefecture-level divisions
- Sub-provincial cities: 2
- Prefectural cities: 12

County level divisions
- County cities: 16
- Counties: 18
- Autonomous counties: 8
- Districts: 59

Township level divisions
- Towns: 585
- Townships: 313
- Ethnic townships / towns^{*}: 78
- Subdistricts: 526

Villages level divisions
- Communities: 4,293
- Administrative villages: 11,558

Liaoning, a province of the People's Republic of China, is made up of the following three levels of administrative division.

== Administrative divisions ==
All of these administrative divisions are explained in greater detail at Administrative divisions of the People's Republic of China. This chart lists only prefecture-level and county-level divisions of Liaoning.

Prefecture level	County Level				
Prefecture level	Name	Chinese	Hanyu Pinyin	Division code	
Shenyang city 沈阳市; Shěnyáng Shì (Capital – Sub-provincial) (2101 / SHE)	Heping District	和平区	Hépíng Qū	210102	HEP
Shenyang city 沈阳市; Shěnyáng Shì (Capital – Sub-provincial) (2101 / SHE)	Shenhe District	沈河区	Shěnhé Qū	210103	SHQ
Shenyang city 沈阳市; Shěnyáng Shì (Capital – Sub-provincial) (2101 / SHE)	Dadong District	大东区	Dàdōng Qū	210104	DDQ
Shenyang city 沈阳市; Shěnyáng Shì (Capital – Sub-provincial) (2101 / SHE)	Huanggu District	皇姑区	Huánggū Qū	210105	HGU
Shenyang city 沈阳市; Shěnyáng Shì (Capital – Sub-provincial) (2101 / SHE)	Tiexi District	铁西区	Tiěxī Qū	210106	TXI
Shenyang city 沈阳市; Shěnyáng Shì (Capital – Sub-provincial) (2101 / SHE)	Sujiatun District	苏家屯区	Sūjiātún Qū	210111	SJT
Shenyang city 沈阳市; Shěnyáng Shì (Capital – Sub-provincial) (2101 / SHE)	Hunnan District	浑南区	Húnnán Qū	210112	DLQ
Shenyang city 沈阳市; Shěnyáng Shì (Capital – Sub-provincial) (2101 / SHE)	Shenbei New Area	沈北新区	Shěnběi Xīn Qū	210113	SBX
Shenyang city 沈阳市; Shěnyáng Shì (Capital – Sub-provincial) (2101 / SHE)	Yuhong District	于洪区	Yúhóng Qū	210114	YHQ
Shenyang city 沈阳市; Shěnyáng Shì (Capital – Sub-provincial) (2101 / SHE)	Liaozhong District	辽中区	Liáozhōng Qū	210115	LZF
Shenyang city 沈阳市; Shěnyáng Shì (Capital – Sub-provincial) (2101 / SHE)	Kangping County	康平县	Kāngpíng Xiàn	210123	KPG
Shenyang city 沈阳市; Shěnyáng Shì (Capital – Sub-provincial) (2101 / SHE)	Faku County	法库县	Fǎkù Xiàn	210124	FKU
Shenyang city 沈阳市; Shěnyáng Shì (Capital – Sub-provincial) (2101 / SHE)	Xinmin city	新民市	Xīnmín Shì	210181	XMS
Dalian city 大连市; Dàlián Shì (Sub-provincial) (2102 / DLC)	Zhongshan District	中山区	Zhōngshān Qū	210202	ZSD
Dalian city 大连市; Dàlián Shì (Sub-provincial) (2102 / DLC)	Xigang District	西岗区	Xīgǎng Qū	210203	XGD
Dalian city 大连市; Dàlián Shì (Sub-provincial) (2102 / DLC)	Shahekou District	沙河口区	Shākékǒu Qū	210204	SHK
Dalian city 大连市; Dàlián Shì (Sub-provincial) (2102 / DLC)	Ganjingzi District	甘井子区	Gānjǐngzi Qū	210211	GJZ
Dalian city 大连市; Dàlián Shì (Sub-provincial) (2102 / DLC)	Lüshunkou District	旅顺口区	Lǚshùnkǒu Qū	210212	LSK
Dalian city 大连市; Dàlián Shì (Sub-provincial) (2102 / DLC)	Jinzhou District	金州区	Jīnzhōu Qū	210213	JZH
Dalian city 大连市; Dàlián Shì (Sub-provincial) (2102 / DLC)	Pulandian District	普兰店区	Pǔlándiàn Qū	210214	PLN
Dalian city 大连市; Dàlián Shì (Sub-provincial) (2102 / DLC)	Changhai County	长海县	Chánghǎi Xiàn	210224	CHX
Dalian city 大连市; Dàlián Shì (Sub-provincial) (2102 / DLC)	Wafangdian city	瓦房店市	Wǎfángdiàn Shì	210281	WFD
Dalian city 大连市; Dàlián Shì (Sub-provincial) (2102 / DLC)	Zhuanghe city	庄河市	Zhuānghé Shì	210283	ZHH
Anshan city 鞍山市; Ānshān Shì (2103 / ASN)	Tiedong District	铁东区	Tiědōng Qū	210302	TED
Anshan city 鞍山市; Ānshān Shì (2103 / ASN)	Tiexi District	铁西区	Tiěxī Qū	210303	TXL
Anshan city 鞍山市; Ānshān Shì (2103 / ASN)	Lishan District	立山区	Lìshān Qū	210304	LAS
Anshan city 鞍山市; Ānshān Shì (2103 / ASN)	Qianshan District	千山区	Qiānshān Qū	210311	QSQ
Anshan city 鞍山市; Ānshān Shì (2103 / ASN)	Tai'an County	台安县	Tái'ān Xiàn	210321	TAX
Anshan city 鞍山市; Ānshān Shì (2103 / ASN)	Xiuyan County (Note: Conventional name: Xiuyan Manchu Autonomous County; Chinese: 岫岩满族自治县; pinyin: Xiùyán Mǎnzú Zìzhìxiàn)	岫岩县	Xiùyán Xiàn	210323	XYL
Anshan city 鞍山市; Ānshān Shì (2103 / ASN)	Haicheng city	海城市	Hǎichéng Shì	210381	HCL
Fushun city 抚顺市; Fǔshùn Shì (2104 / FSN)	Xinfu District	新抚区	Xīnfǔ Qū	210402	XFU
Fushun city 抚顺市; Fǔshùn Shì (2104 / FSN)	Dongzhou District	东洲区	Dōngzhōu Qū	210403	DOZ
Fushun city 抚顺市; Fǔshùn Shì (2104 / FSN)	Wanghua District	望花区	Wànghuā Qū	210404	WHF
Fushun city 抚顺市; Fǔshùn Shì (2104 / FSN)	Shuncheng District	顺城区	Shùnchéng Qū	210411	SCF
Fushun city 抚顺市; Fǔshùn Shì (2104 / FSN)	Fushun County	抚顺县	Fǔshùn Xiàn	210421	FSX
Fushun city 抚顺市; Fǔshùn Shì (2104 / FSN)	Xinbin County (Note: Conventional name: Xinbin Manchu Autonomous County; Chinese: 新宾满族自治县; pinyin: Xīnbīn Mǎnzú Zìzhìxiàn)	新宾县	Xīnbīn Xiàn	210422	XBN
Fushun city 抚顺市; Fǔshùn Shì (2104 / FSN)	Qingyuan County (Note: Conventional name: Qingyuan Manchu Autonomous County; Chinese: 清原满族自治县; pinyin: Qīngyuán Mǎnzú Zìzhìxiàn)	清原县	Qīngyuán Xiàn	210423	QYA
Benxi city 本溪市; Běnxī Shì (2105 / BXS)	Pingshan District	平山区	Píngshān Qū	210502	PSN
Benxi city 本溪市; Běnxī Shì (2105 / BXS)	Xihu District	溪湖区	Xīhú Qū	210503	XHB
Benxi city 本溪市; Běnxī Shì (2105 / BXS)	Mingshan District	明山区	Míngshān Qū	210504	MSB
Benxi city 本溪市; Běnxī Shì (2105 / BXS)	Nanfen District	南芬区	Nánfēn Qū	210505	NFQ
Benxi city 本溪市; Běnxī Shì (2105 / BXS)	Benxi County (Note: Conventional name: Benxi Manchu Autonomous County; Chinese: 本溪满族自治县; pinyin: Běnxī Mǎnzú Zìzhìxiàn)	本溪县	Běnxī Xiàn	210521	BXX
Benxi city 本溪市; Běnxī Shì (2105 / BXS)	Huanren County (Note: Conventional name: Huanren Manchu Autonomous County; Chinese: 桓仁满族自治县; pinyin: Huánrén Mǎnzú Zìzhìxiàn)	桓仁县	Huánrén Xiàn	210522	HRL
Dandong city 丹东市; Dāndōng Shì (2106 / DDG)	Yuanbao District	元宝区	Yuánbǎo Qū	210602	YBD
Dandong city 丹东市; Dāndōng Shì (2106 / DDG)	Zhenxing District	振兴区	Zhènxīng Qū	210603	ZXQ
Dandong city 丹东市; Dāndōng Shì (2106 / DDG)	Zhen'an District	振安区	Zhèn'ān Qū	210604	ZAQ
Dandong city 丹东市; Dāndōng Shì (2106 / DDG)	Kuandian County (Note: Conventional name: Kuandian Manchu Autonomous County; Chinese: 宽甸满族自治县; pinyin: Kuāndiàn Mǎnzú Zìzhìxiàn)	宽甸县	Kuāndiàn Xiàn	210624	KDN
Dandong city 丹东市; Dāndōng Shì (2106 / DDG)	Donggang city	东港市	Dōnggǎng Shì	210681	DGS
Dandong city 丹东市; Dāndōng Shì (2106 / DDG)	Fengcheng city	凤城市	Fèngchéng Shì	210682	FCL
Jinzhou city 锦州市; Jǐnzhōu Shì (2107 / JNZ)	Guta District	古塔区	Gǔtǎ Qū	210702	GTQ
Jinzhou city 锦州市; Jǐnzhōu Shì (2107 / JNZ)	Linghe District	凌河区	Línghé Qū	210703	LHF
Jinzhou city 锦州市; Jǐnzhōu Shì (2107 / JNZ)	Taihe District	太和区	Tàihé Qū	210711	THJ
Jinzhou city 锦州市; Jǐnzhōu Shì (2107 / JNZ)	Heishan County	黑山县	Hēishān Xiàn	210726	HSL
Jinzhou city 锦州市; Jǐnzhōu Shì (2107 / JNZ)	Yixian County (Note: Official name registered by the Ministry of Civil Affairs.)	义县	Yìxiàn	210727	YXL
Jinzhou city 锦州市; Jǐnzhōu Shì (2107 / JNZ)	Linghai city	凌海市	Línghǎi Shì	210781	LHL
Jinzhou city 锦州市; Jǐnzhōu Shì (2107 / JNZ)	Beizhen city	北镇市	Běizhèn Shì	210782	BZN
Yingkou city 营口市; Yíngkǒu Shì (2108 / YIK)	Zhanqian District	站前区	Zhànqián Qū	210802	ZQQ
Yingkou city 营口市; Yíngkǒu Shì (2108 / YIK)	Xishi District	西市区	Xīshì Qū	210803	XII
Yingkou city 营口市; Yíngkǒu Shì (2108 / YIK)	Bayuquan District	鲅鱼圈区	Bàyúquān Qū	210804	BYQ
Yingkou city 营口市; Yíngkǒu Shì (2108 / YIK)	Laobian District	老边区	Lǎobiān Qū	210811	LOB
Yingkou city 营口市; Yíngkǒu Shì (2108 / YIK)	Gaizhou city	盖州市	Gàizhōu Shì	210881	GZU
Yingkou city 营口市; Yíngkǒu Shì (2108 / YIK)	Dashiqiao city	大石桥市	Dàshíqiáo Shì	210882	DSQ
Fuxin city 阜新市; Fùxīn Shì (2109 / FXS)	Haizhou District	海州区	Hǎizhōu Qū	210902	HZF
Fuxin city 阜新市; Fùxīn Shì (2109 / FXS)	Xinqiu District	新邱区	Xīnqiū Qū	210903	XQF
Fuxin city 阜新市; Fùxīn Shì (2109 / FXS)	Taiping District	太平区	Tàipíng Qū	210904	TPG
Fuxin city 阜新市; Fùxīn Shì (2109 / FXS)	Qinghemen District	清河门区	Qīnghémén Qū	210905	QHM
Fuxin city 阜新市; Fùxīn Shì (2109 / FXS)	Xihe District	细河区	Xìhé Qū	210911	XHO
Fuxin city 阜新市; Fùxīn Shì (2109 / FXS)	Fuxin County (Note: Conventional name: Fuxin Mongol Autonomous County; Chinese: 阜新蒙古族自治县; pinyin: Fùxīn Měnggǔzú Zìzhìxiàn)	阜新县	Fùxīn Xiàn	210921	FXX
Fuxin city 阜新市; Fùxīn Shì (2109 / FXS)	Zhangwu County	彰武县	Zhāngwǔ Xiàn	210922	ZWU
Liaoyang city 辽阳市; Liáoyáng Shì (2110 / LYL)	Baita District	白塔区	Báitǎ Qū	211002	BTL
Liaoyang city 辽阳市; Liáoyáng Shì (2110 / LYL)	Wensheng District	文圣区	Wénshèng Qū	211003	WSL
Liaoyang city 辽阳市; Liáoyáng Shì (2110 / LYL)	Hongwei District	宏伟区	Hóngwěi Qū	211004	HWQ
Liaoyang city 辽阳市; Liáoyáng Shì (2110 / LYL)	Gongchangling District	弓长岭区	Gōngchánglǐng Qū	211005	GCL
Liaoyang city 辽阳市; Liáoyáng Shì (2110 / LYL)	Taizihe District	太子河区	Tàizǐhé Qū	211011	TZH
Liaoyang city 辽阳市; Liáoyáng Shì (2110 / LYL)	Liaoyang County	辽阳县	Liáoyáng Xiàn	211021	LYX
Liaoyang city 辽阳市; Liáoyáng Shì (2110 / LYL)	Dengta city	灯塔市	Dēngtǎ Shì	211081	DTA
Panjin city 盘锦市; Pánjǐn Shì (2111 / PJS)	Shuangtaizi District	双台子区	Shuāngtáizi Qū	211102	STZ
Panjin city 盘锦市; Pánjǐn Shì (2111 / PJS)	Xinglongtai District	兴隆台区	Xīnglóngtái Qū	211103	XLT
Panjin city 盘锦市; Pánjǐn Shì (2111 / PJS)	Dawa District	大洼区	Dàwā Qū	211104	DWL
Panjin city 盘锦市; Pánjǐn Shì (2111 / PJS)	Panshan County	盘山县	Pánshān Xiàn	211122	PNS
Tieling city 铁岭市; Tiělǐng Shì (2112 / TLS)	Yinzhou District	银州区	Yínzhōu Qū	211202	YZU
Tieling city 铁岭市; Tiělǐng Shì (2112 / TLS)	Qinghe District	清河区	Qīnghé Qū	211204	QHQ
Tieling city 铁岭市; Tiělǐng Shì (2112 / TLS)	Tieling County	铁岭县	Tiělǐng Xiàn	211221	TLG
Tieling city 铁岭市; Tiělǐng Shì (2112 / TLS)	Xifeng County	西丰县	Xīfēng Xiàn	211223	XIF
Tieling city 铁岭市; Tiělǐng Shì (2112 / TLS)	Changtu County	昌图县	Chāngtú Xiàn	211224	CTX
Tieling city 铁岭市; Tiělǐng Shì (2112 / TLS)	Diaobingshan city	调兵山市	Diàobīngshān Shì	211281	DBS
Tieling city 铁岭市; Tiělǐng Shì (2112 / TLS)	Kaiyuan city	开原市	Kāiyuán Shì	211282	KYS
Chaoyang city 朝阳市; Cháoyáng Shì (2113 / CYS)	Shuangta District	双塔区	Shuāngtǎ Qū	211302	STQ
Chaoyang city 朝阳市; Cháoyáng Shì (2113 / CYS)	Longcheng District	龙城区	Lóngchéng Qū	211303	LCL
Chaoyang city 朝阳市; Cháoyáng Shì (2113 / CYS)	Chaoyang County	朝阳县	Cháoyáng Xiàn	211321	CYG
Chaoyang city 朝阳市; Cháoyáng Shì (2113 / CYS)	Jianping County	建平县	Jiànpíng Xiàn	211322	JPG
Chaoyang city 朝阳市; Cháoyáng Shì (2113 / CYS)	Kalaqin Zuoyi County (Note: Conventional name: Harqin Left Mongol Autonomous County; Chinese: 喀喇沁左翼蒙古族自治县; pinyin: Kālāqìn Zuǒyì Měnggǔzú Zìzhìxiàn)	喀喇沁左翼县	Kālāqìn Zuǒyì Xiàn	211324	HAZ
Chaoyang city 朝阳市; Cháoyáng Shì (2113 / CYS)	Beipiao city	北票市	Běipiào Shì	211381	BPO
Chaoyang city 朝阳市; Cháoyáng Shì (2113 / CYS)	Lingyuan city	凌源市	Língyuán Shì	211382	LYK
Huludao city 葫芦岛市; Húludǎo Shì (2114 / HLD)	Lianshan District	连山区	Liánshān Qū	211402	LSQ
Huludao city 葫芦岛市; Húludǎo Shì (2114 / HLD)	Longgang District	龙港区	Lónggǎng Qū	211403	LGD
Huludao city 葫芦岛市; Húludǎo Shì (2114 / HLD)	Nanpiao District	南票区	Nánpiào Qū	211404	NPQ
Huludao city 葫芦岛市; Húludǎo Shì (2114 / HLD)	Suizhong County	绥中县	Suízhōng Xiàn	211421	SZL
Huludao city 葫芦岛市; Húludǎo Shì (2114 / HLD)	Jianchang County	建昌县	Jiànchāng Xiàn	211422	JCL
Huludao city 葫芦岛市; Húludǎo Shì (2114 / HLD)	Xingcheng city	兴城市	Xīngchéng Shì	211481	XCL

== Recent changes in administrative divisions ==
Date	Before	After	Note	Reference
1970-01-16	parts of Tai'an County	Panshan District (County)	established	
1970-01-16	parts of Tai'an County	Dawa District (County)	established	
1973-01-01	Yingkou (P-City)	Anshan (P-City)	transferred	
1973-01-01	↳ Haicheng County	↳ Haicheng County	transferred	
1975-11-09	Panjin Prefecture	Yingkou (P-City)	disestablished & merged into	
1975-11-09	↳ Panshan District (County)	↳ Panshan County	transferred & reorganized	
1975-11-09	↳ Dawa District (County)	↳ Dawa County	transferred & reorganized	
1975-11-09	Panjin Prefecture	Anshan (P-City)	disestablished & merged into	
1975-11-09	↳ Tai'an County	↳ Tai'an County	transferred	
1978-04-13	Shaling District	Shoushan District	disestablished & established	
1978-04-13	Shaling District	Jiao District, Liaoyuan	disestablished & established	
1978-04-13	Shaling District	Hongwei District	disestablished & established	
1978-12-16	parts of Fushun County	Jiao District, Fushun	established	
1979-05-30	parts of Liaoning Province	Inner Mongolia A.R.	provincial transferred	
1979-05-30	Ju'ud League	Ju'ud League	transferred	
1979-05-30	↳ Chifeng County	↳ Chifeng County	transferred	
1979-05-30	↳ Ningcheng County	↳ Ningcheng County	transferred	
1979-05-30	↳ Linxi County	↳ Linxi County	transferred	
1979-05-30	↳ Aohan Banner	↳ Aohan Banner	transferred	
1979-05-30	↳ Ongniud Banner	↳ Ongniud Banner	transferred	
1979-05-30	↳ Harqin Banner	↳ Harqin Banner	transferred	
1979-05-30	↳ Bairin Right Banner	↳ Bairin Right Banner	transferred	
1979-05-30	↳ Bairin Left Banner	↳ Bairin Left Banner	transferred	
1979-05-30	↳ Hexigten Banner	↳ Hexigten Banner	transferred	
1979-05-30	↳ Arhorqin Banner	↳ Arhorqin Banner	transferred	
1979-05-30	↳ Chifeng (PC-City)	↳ Chifeng (PC-City)	transferred	
1979-08-30	parts of Chaoyang County	Chaoyang (PC-City)	established	
1980-03-08	Jiao District, Dandong	Zhen'an District	renamed	
1980-04-15	Shoushan District	Liaoyang County	reorganized	
1980-04-15	Dengta District	Dengta County	reorganized	
1981-02-09	Lüda (P-City)	Dalian (P-City)	renamed	
1981-09-21	parts of Tieling County	Tiefa (PC-City)	established	
1981-09-21	parts of Faku County	Tiefa (PC-City)	established	
1982-09-09	parts of Jinxi County	Nanpiao District	established	
1982-09-09	parts of Jinxi County	Huludao District	established	
1982-09-09	Jiao District, Jinzhou	Taihe District	established	
1983-01-18	all Province-controlled city (P-City) → Prefecture-level city (PL-City)			Civil Affairs Announcement
1983-01-18	all Prefecture-controlled city (PC-City) → County-level city (CL-City)			Civil Affairs Announcement
1983-02-21	parts of Jiao District, Fuxin	Qinghemen District	established	
1983-12-30	Jiao District, Anshan	Jiubao District	renamed	
1984-01-27	parts of Gai County	Bayuquan District	established	
1984-05-10	parts of Liaoyang County	Gongchangling District	established	
1984-06-05	parts of Yingkou (PL-City)	Panjin (PL-City)	established	
1984-06-05	↳ Panshan County	↳ Xinglongtai District	disestablished & established	
1984-06-05	↳ Panshan County	↳ Panshan District	disestablished & established	
1984-06-05	↳ Panshan County	↳ Jiao District, Panjin	disestablished & established	
1984-06-05	↳ Dawa County	↳ Dawa County	transferred	
1984-06-30	Jiao District, Liaoyang	Taizihe District	renamed	
1984-06-30	Tieling Prefecture	Tieling (PL-City)	reorganized	
1984-06-30	Tieling (CL-City)	Yinzhou District	reorganized	
1984-06-30	Tiefa (CL-City)	Tiefa District	reorganized	
1984-06-30	parts of Kaiyuan County	Qinghe District	established	
1984-06-30	Chaoyang Prefecture	Chaoyang (PL-City)	reorganized	
1984-06-30	Chaoyang (CL-City)	Shuangta District	disestablished & established	
1984-06-30	Chaoyang (CL-City)	Longcheng District	disestablished & established	
1984-06-30	parts of Chaoyang County	Longcheng District	merged into	
1984-07-13	Jiao District, Yingkou	Laobian District	renamed	
1984-09-11	Jiao District, Fuxin	Xihe District	renamed	
1984-10-20	Lixin District	Mingshan District	renamed	
1984-10-20	Lixin District	Nanfen District	established	
1984-10-20	Lixin District	Pingshan District	merged into	
1984-10-20	Lixin District	Xihu District	merged into	
1985-01-17	Xiuyan County	Xiuyan County (Aut.)	reorganized	
1985-01-17	Fengcheng County	Fengcheng County (Aut.)	reorganized	
1985-01-17	Xinbin County	Xinbin County (Aut.)	reorganized	
1985-01-17	Jinxi County	Jinxi (CL-City)	reorganized	
1985-01-17	Beipiao County	Beipiao (CL-City)	reorganized	
1985-01-17	Haicheng County	Haicheng (CL-City)	reorganized	
1985-01-17	Fu County	Wafangdian (CL-City)	reorganized	
1986-09-12	Tiefa District	Tiefa (CL-City)	reorganized	
1986-11-05	Jiao District, Panjin	Panshan County	reorganized	
1986-11-05	Panshan District	Shuangtaizi District	renamed	
1986-12-13	Xingcheng County	Xingcheng (CL-City)	reorganized	
1987-04-21	Jin County	Jinzhou District	reorganized	
1988-03-16	Jiao District, Fushun	Shuncheng District	renamed	
1988-12-27	Kaiyuan County	Kaiyuan (CL-City)	reorganized	
1989-06-12	parts of Jinzhou (PL-City)	Jinxi (PL-City)	established	
1989-06-12	↳ Jinxi (CL-City)	↳ Lianshan District	reorganized	
1989-06-12	↳ Huludao District	↳ Huludao County	transferred	
1989-06-12	↳ Nanpiao District	↳ Nanpiao District	transferred	
1989-06-12	↳ Suizhong County	↳ Suizhong County	transferred	
1989-06-12	↳ Xingcheng (CL-City)	↳ Xingcheng (CL-City)	transferred	
1989-06-12	parts of Chaoyang (PL-City)	Jinxi (PL-City)	established	
1989-06-12	↳ Jianchang County	↳ Jianchang County	transferred	
1989-06-29	Beizhen County	Beizhen County (Aut.)	reorganized	
1989-06-29	Qingyuan County	Qingyuan County (Aut.)	reorganized	
1989-09-07	Benxi County	Benxi County (Aut.)	reorganized	
1989-09-07	Huanren County	Huanren County (Aut.)	reorganized	
1989-09-07	Kuandian County	Kuandian County (Aut.)	reorganized	
1991-11-30	Xinjin County	Pulandian (CL-City)	reorganized	Civil Affairs [1991]75
1991-12-21	Lingyuan County	Lingyuan (CL-City)	reorganized	Civil Affairs [1991]93
1992-01-23	parts of Dandong (PL-City)	Anshan (PL-City)	transferred	Civil Affairs [1992]9
1992-01-23	↳ Xiuyan County (Aut.)	↳ Xiuyan County (Aut.)	transferred	Civil Affairs [1992]9
1992-09-21	Zhuanghe County	Zhuanghe (CL-City)	reorganized	Civil Affairs [1992]105
1992-11-03	Gaizhou County	Gaizhou (CL-City)	reorganized	Civil Affairs [1992]128
1992-11-03	Yingkou County	Dashiqiao (CL-City)	reorganized	Civil Affairs [1992]129
1992-12-12	parts of Tieling (PL-City)	Shenyang (PL-City)	transferred	Civil Affairs [1992]160
1992-12-12	↳ Kangping County	↳ Kangping County	transferred	Civil Affairs [1992]160
1992-12-12	↳ Faku County	↳ Faku County	transferred	Civil Affairs [1992]160
1993-06-18	Donggou County	Donggang (CL-City)	reorganized	Civil Affairs [1993]132
1993-06-14	Xinmin County	Xinmin (CL-City)	reorganized	
1993-11-16	Jin County	Linghai (CL-City)	reorganized	Civil Affairs [1993]231
1994-03-08	Fengcheng County (Aut.)	Fengcheng (CL-City)	reorganized	Civil Affairs [1994]41
1994-09-20	Jinxi (PL-City)	Huludao (PL-City)	renamed	State Council [1994]97
1994-09-20	Huludao District	Longgang District	renamed	State Council [1994]97
1995-03-21	Beizhen County (Aut.)	Beining (CL-City)	reorganized	Civil Affairs [1995]21
1996-04-19	Jiubao District	Qianshan District	renamed	Civil Affairs [1996]25
1996-08-29	Dengta County	Dengta (CL-City)	reorganized	Civil Affairs [1996]63
1999-06-16	Lutian District	Dongzhou District	renamed	Civil Affairs [1999]43
2002-02-20	Tiefa (CL-City)	Diaobingshan (CL-City)	renamed	
2006-02-08	Beining (CL-City)	Beizhen (CL-City)	renamed	Civil Affairs [2006]32
2006-09-26	Xinchengzi District	Shenbei District	renamed	Civil Affairs [2006]300
2014-06-17	Dongling District	Hunnan District	renamed	Civil Affairs [2014]171
2015-10-13	Pulandian (CL-City)	Pulandian District	reorganized	State Council [2015]145
2016-01-09	Liaozhong County	Liaozhong District	reorganized	State Council [2016]6
2016-03-20	Dawa County	Dawa District	reorganized	State Council [2016]53

== Population composition ==
=== Prefectures ===
Prefecture	2010	2000
Shenyang	8,106,171	7,203,717
Dalian	6,690,432	5,893,692
Anshan	3,645,884	3,584,039
Benxi	1,709,538	1,567,408
Chaoyang	3,044,641	3,194,828
Dandong	2,444,697	2,390,524
Fushun	2,220,545	
Fuxin	1,819,339	1,889,774
Huludao	2,623,541	2,580,685
Jinzhou	3,126,463	3,076,735
Liaoyang	1,858,768	1,801,207
Panjin	1,392,493	1,261,753
Tieling	2,717,732	2,823,220
Yingkou	2,428,534	2,296,540

=== Counties ===
Name	Prefecture	~~2010~~
Heping	Shenyang	638,959
Shenhe	Shenyang	719,033
Dadong	Shenyang	696,711
Huanggu	Shenyang	809,100
Tiexi	Shenyang	878,261
Sujiatun	Shenyang	429,143
Dongling	Shenyang	301,832
Shenbei	Shenyang	318,895
Yuhong	Shenyang	408,798
Liaozhong	Shenyang	538,220
Kangping	Shenyang	351,188
Faku	Shenyang	446,223
Xinmin	Shenyang	696,895
Zhongshan	Dalian	357,091
Xigang	Dalian	307,850
Shahekou	Dalian	653,762
Ganjingzi	Dalian	722,559
Lushunkou	Dalian	212,752
Jinzhou	Dalian	729,100
Changhai	Dalian	74,010
Wafangdian	Dalian	1,026,160
Pulandian	Dalian	827,585
Zhuanghe	Dalian	922,876
Haizhou	Fuxin	277,902
Xinqiu	Fuxin	91,376
Taiping	Fuxin	171,625
Qinghemen	Fuxin	73,923
Xihe	Fuxin	165,525
Zhangwu	Fuxin	417,724
Fuxin	Fuxin	732,630
Pingshan	Benxi	349,130
Xihu	Benxi	252,671
Mingshan	Benxi	409,576
Nanfen	Benxi	82,917
Benxi	Benxi	296,218
Huanren	Benxi	319,026
Yuanbao	Dandong	191,200
Zhenxing	Dandong	372,400
Zhen'an	Dandong	173,800
Kuandian	Dandong	434,900
Donggang	Dandong	664,000
Fengcheng	Dandong	587,900
Baita	Liaoyang	210,317
Wensheng	Liaoyang	184,129
Hongwei	Liaoyang	117,776
Gongchangling	Liaoyang	89,441
Taizihe	Liaoyang	123,415
Dengta	Liaoyang	513,538
Liaoyang	Liaoyang	595,189
Shuangtaizi	Panjin	195,486
Xinglongtai	Panjin	398,919
Dawa	Panjin	393,318
Panshan	Panjin	294,646
Yinzhou	Tieling	346,613
Qinghe	Tieling	98,421
Tieling	Tieling	389,494
Xifeng	Tieling	349,187
Changtu	Tieling	1,038,848
Diaobingshan	Tieling	241,028
Kaiyuan	Tieling	590,888
Shuangta	Chaoyang	315,437
Longcheng	Chaoyang	188,434
Beipiao	Chaoyang	617,236
Lingyuan	Chaoyang	644,630
Chaoyang	Chaoyang	628,066
Jianping	Chaoyang	583,307
Harqin	Chaoyang	424,546
Xinfu	Fushun	276,518
Dongzhou	Fushun	335,779
Wanghua	Fushun	371,592
Shuncheng	Fushun	416,856
Fushun	Fushun	190,528
Xinbin	Fushun	306,018
Qingyuan	Fushun	339,969
Tiedong	Anshan	491,707
Tiexi	Anshan	294,585
Lishan	Anshan	427,434
Qianshan	Anshan	259,819
Tai'an	Anshan	377,706
Xiuyan	Anshan	517,152
Haicheng	Anshan	1,134,065
Zhanqian	Yingkou	383,241
Xishi	Yingkou	204,105
Bayuquan	Yingkou	431,329
Laobian	Yingkou	165,047
Gaizhou	Yingkou	723,218
Dashiqiao	Yingkou	721,363
Guta	Jinzhou	250,577
Taihe	Jinzhou	454,883
Linghe	Jinzhou	212,030
Heishan	Jinzhou	630,472
Yi(xian)	Jinzhou	439,377
Linghai	Jinzhou	576,143
Beizhen	Jinzhou	530,645
Lianshan	Huludao	626,573
Longgang	Huludao	202,306
Nanpiao	Huludao	147,047
Suizhong	Huludao	636,858
Jianchang	Huludao	622,068
Xingcheng	Huludao	552,180
