= Yuanbao =

Yuanbao (simplified Chinese: 元宝; traditional Chinese: 元寶) may refer to:

== Places or structures ==
=== Mainland China ===
- Yuanbao District (元宝区), in Dandong, Liaoning
- Yuanbao, Shangzhi (元宝镇), town in Shangzhi, Heilongjiang
- Yuanbao Township (元宝乡), Qing'an County, Heilongjiang

=== Taiwan ===
- Yuanbao Temple, in Taichung

== Others ==
- Sycee, also known as Yuanbao, a type of silver or gold ingot currency used in China until the 20th century
