= Xingong =

Xingong may refer to:

== Beijing ==
- Xingong, Beijing (新宫), or Xingong Community, in Nanyuan Subdistrict, Fengtai District, Beijing
- Xingong station (新宫), Beijing Subway interchange station, located in Xingong Community, Beijing
- Xingong Site (新宫遗址), one of the earliest Bronze Age settlements ever found in Beijing, located in Xingong Community, Beijing

== Liaoning ==
- Xingong Subdistrict (新工), in Xinglongtai District, Panjin, Liaoning Province, China
