= Wensheng District =

Coordinates: 41°15′49″N 123°11′40″E

Wensheng 文圣区
- District
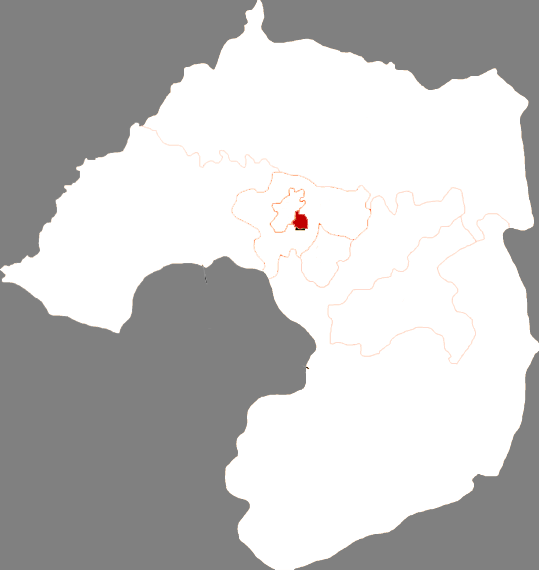
- Wensheng in Liaoyang

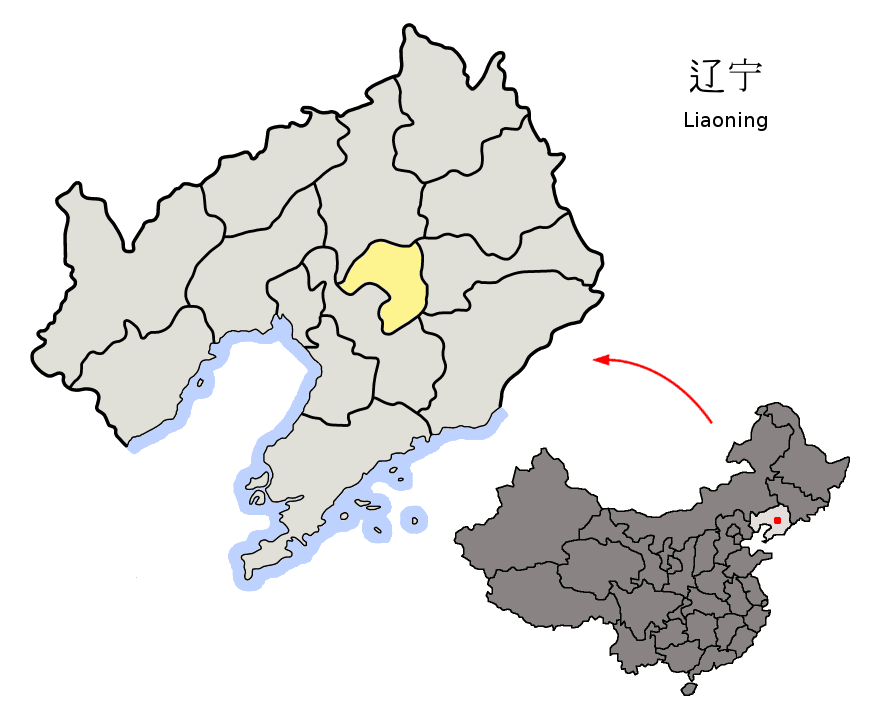
- Liaoyang in Liaoning
- Country: People's Republic of China
- Province: Liaoning
- Prefecture-level city: Liaoyang

Area
  - Total: 287.0 km^{2} (110.8 sq mi)

Population (2020 census)
  - Total: 160,466
  - Density: 559.1/km^{2} (1,448/sq mi)
- Time zone: UTC+8 (China Standard)

Wensheng District (simplified Chinese: 文圣区; traditional Chinese: 文聖區; pinyin: Wénshèng Qū) is a district of the city of Liaoyang, Liaoning province, People's Republic of China.

== Administrative divisions ==
There are six subdistricts within the district.

Subdistricts:

- Wensheng Subdistrict (文圣街道), Wusheng Subdistrict (武圣街道), Xiangping Subdistrict (襄平街道), Nanmen Subdistrict (南门街道), Dongxing Subdistrict (东兴街道), Qingyang Subdistrict (庆阳街道)
