= Taizihe District =

Coordinates: 41°15′12″N 123°10′55″E

Taizihe 太子河区
- District
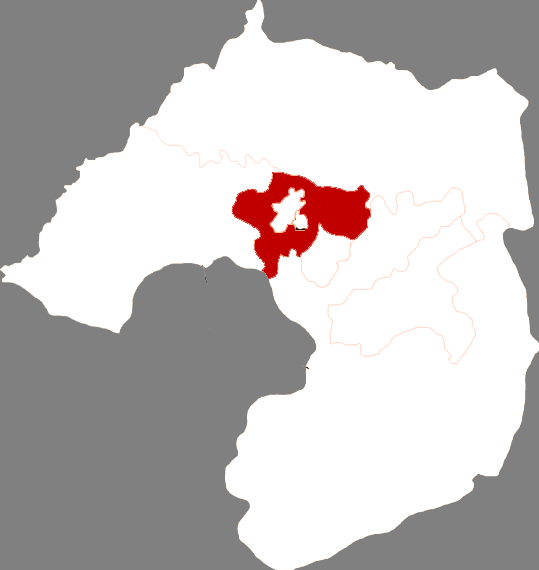
- Taizihe in Liaoyang

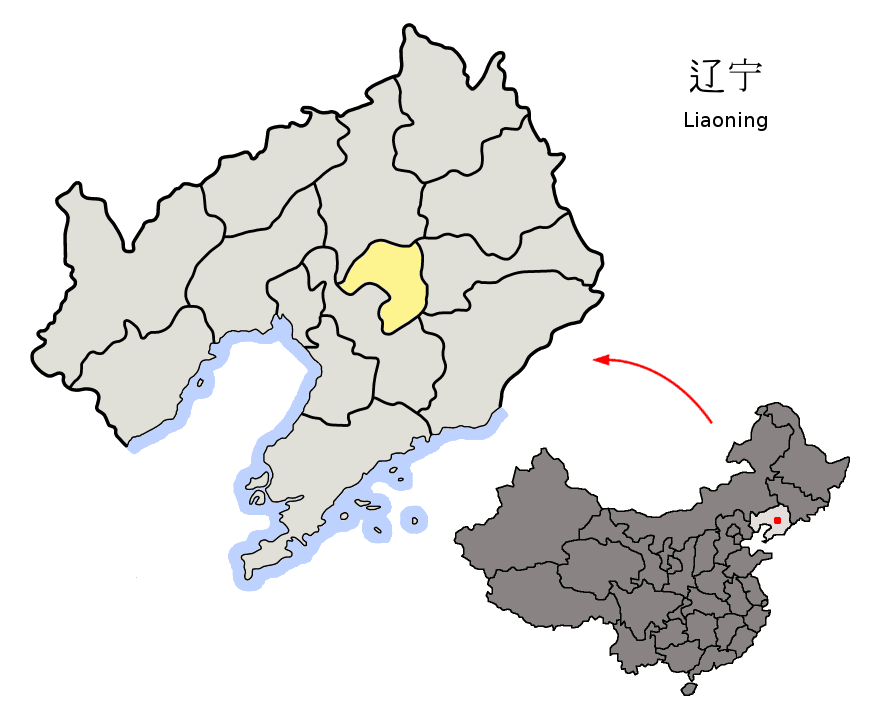
- Liaoyang in Liaoning
- Country: People's Republic of China
- Province: Liaoning
- Prefecture-level city: Liaoyang

Area
  - Total: 279.1 km^{2} (107.8 sq mi)

Population (2020)
  - Total: 134,604
  - Density: 482.3/km^{2} (1,249/sq mi)
- Time zone: UTC+8 (China Standard)

Taizihe District (simplified Chinese: 太子河区; traditional Chinese: 太子河區; pinyin: Tàizǐhé Qū) is a district of the city of Liaoyang, Liaoning province, People's Republic of China.

== Administrative divisions ==
There are two subdistricts, one town, and one township within the district.

Subdistricts:

- Wangshuitai Subdistrict (望水台街道), Xinhua Subdistrict (新华街道)

The only town is Qijia (祁家镇)

Townships:

- Dongningwei Township (东宁卫乡), Dongjingling Township (东京陵乡)
