= Liaoyang =

Liaoyang 辽阳市
- Prefecture-level city
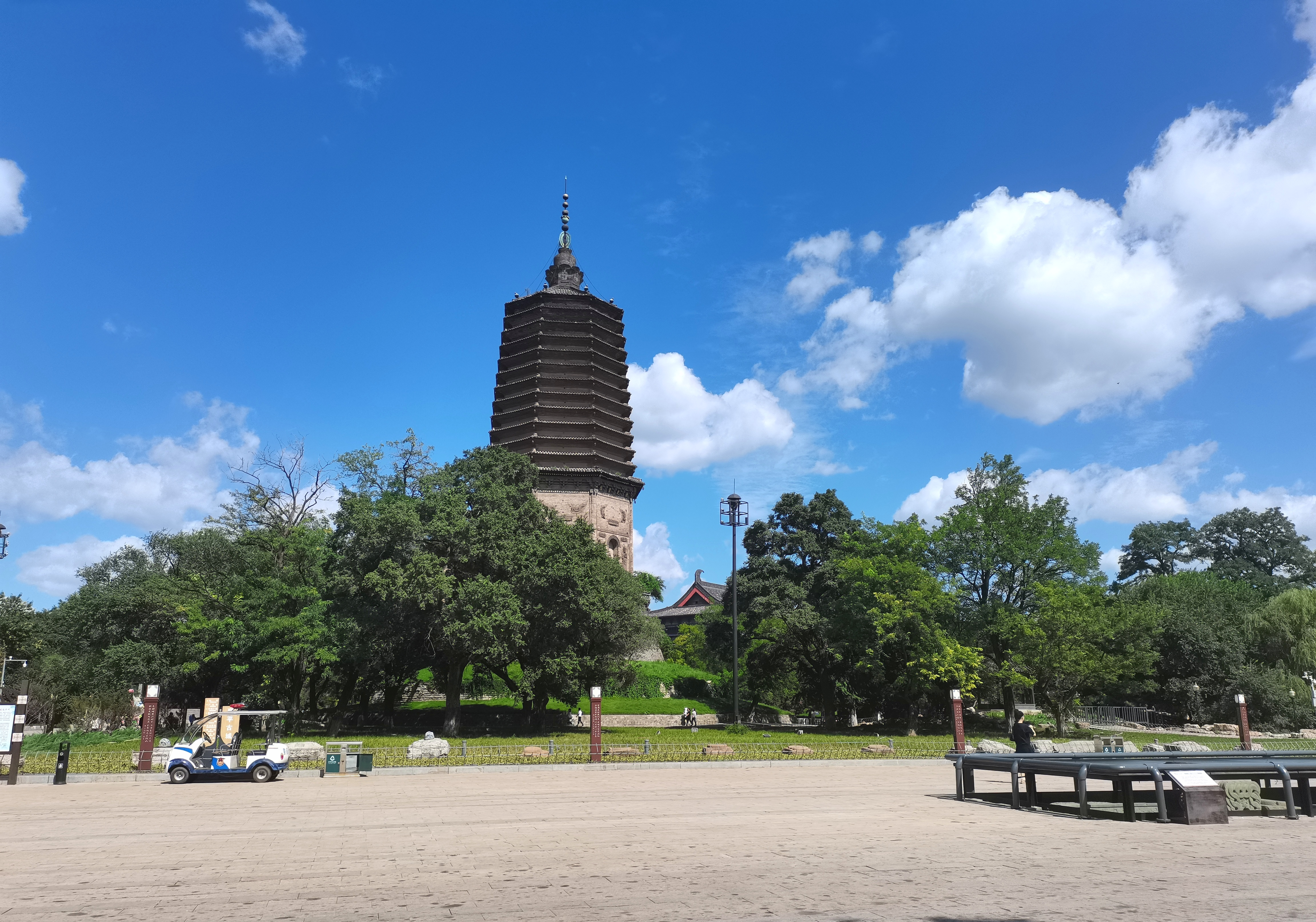
- White Pagoda (Baita) in Liaoyang

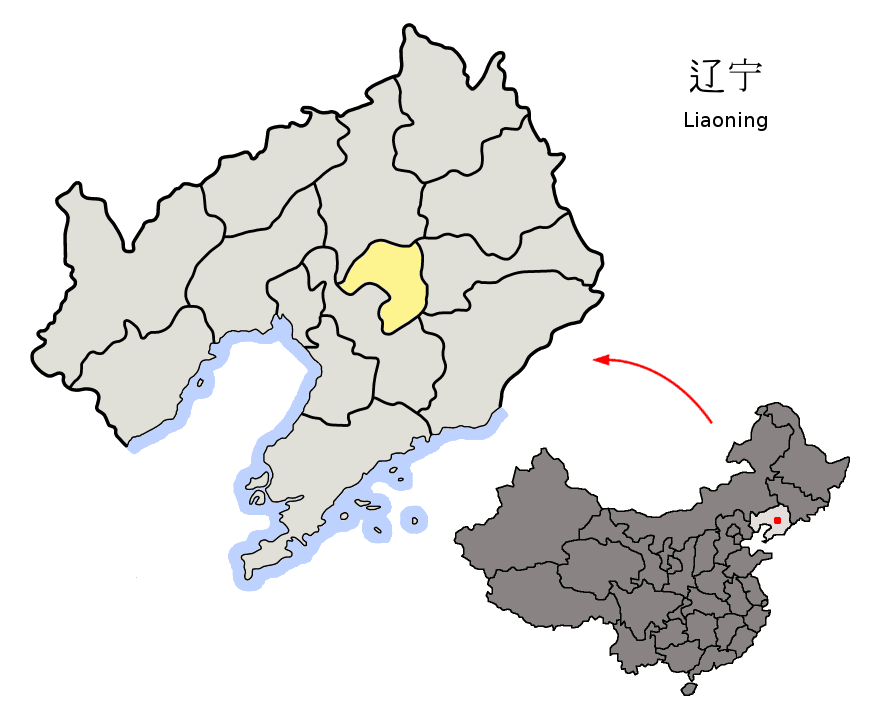
- Location of Liaoyang City jurisdiction in Liaoning

- Location of the city centre in Liaoning
- Coordinates (Baita Park (白塔公园)): 41°16′44″N 123°10′34″E
- Country: People's Republic of China
- Province: Liaoning
- Municipal seat: Baita District
- Districts: List: Baita District; Wensheng District; Hongwei District; Gongchangling District; Taizihe District; Dengta City; Liaoyang County

Government
  - CPC Secretary: Wang Fengbo
  - Mayor: Pei Weidong

Area
  - Prefecture-level city: 4,710 km^{2} (1,820 sq mi)
  - Metro: 3,997.8 km^{2} (1,543.6 sq mi)
- Elevation: 29 m (95 ft)

Population (2020 census)
  - Prefecture-level city: 1,604,580
  - Density: 341/km^{2} (882/sq mi)
  - Urban: 877,832

GDP
  - Prefecture-level city: CN¥ 102.9 billion US$ 16.5 billion
  - Per capita: CN¥ 55,659; US$ 8,936
- Time zone: UTC+8 (China Standard)
- Postal code: 111000
- Area code: 419
- ISO 3166 code: CN-LN-10
- Licence plates: 辽K
- Administrative division code: 211000
- Website: www.liaoyang.gov.cn

Liaoyang (Chinese: 辽阳; pinyin: Liáoyáng) is a prefecture-level city of east-central Liaoning province, China, situated on the Taizi River. It is approximately one hour south of Shenyang, the provincial capital, by car. Liaoyang is home to Liaoning University's College of Foreign Studies and a number of vocational colleges. The city hosts a limited number of professional basketball and volleyball games in a modern sports facility. According to the latest census statistics in 2020, the age distribution of the population in Liaoyang is as follows: 0–14 years old account for 9.83% of the population; 15–59 years old account for 62.26% of the population; 60 years old and above account for 27.91% of the population; 65 years old and above account for 19.46% of the population, respectively.

== History ==
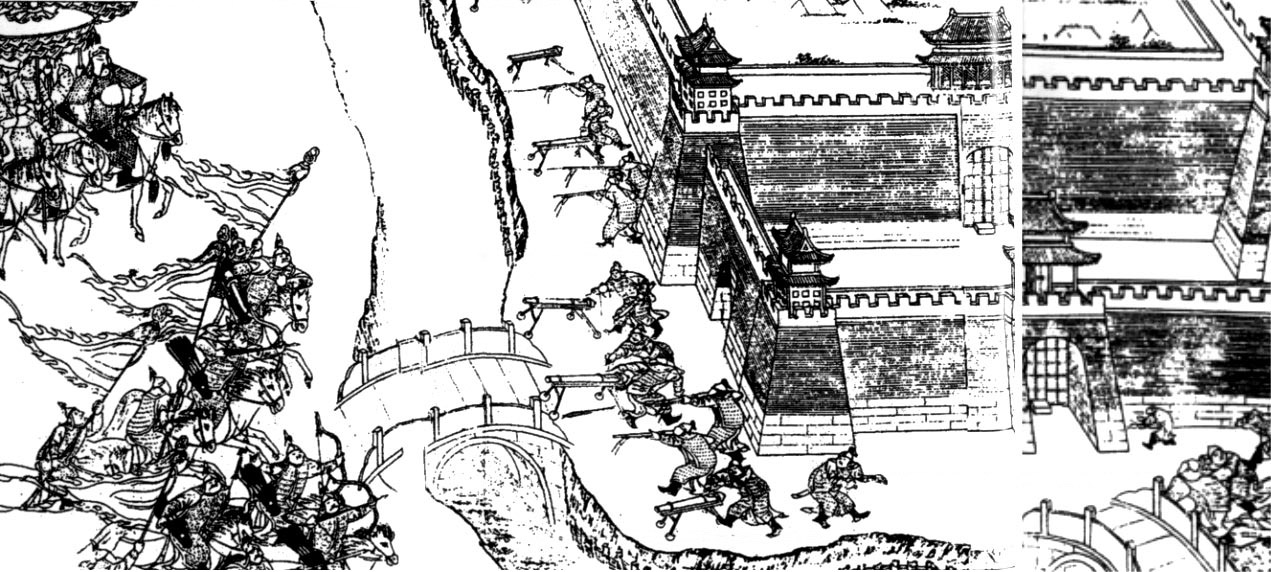
Nurhaci captured Liaoyang in 1621 and made it the capital of his empire until 1625.

Liaoyang is one of the oldest continuously-inhabited cities in northeast China, dating back to before the Warring States period, and the site of the city has not changed ever since. Under the Yan state and the successive Qin and Han dynasties, Liaoyang (then known as Xiangping) was the capital of Liaodong Commandery and the political center of the Liaodong region. During the Three Kingdoms period, the city was the focus of Sima Yi's devastating Liaodong campaign. From the 5th to 7th centuries, Liaoyang was on the northern edge of the Goguryeo kingdom. Remains of Yodong and Baegam, the old Goguryeo cities, can still be seen near the modern city. This was the site of a major battle between the Tang and Goguryeo in 645 AD.

Liaoyang rose to prominence during the Liao dynasty. Several buildings in the city date to this period. Among these is the White Pagoda (baita), which dates back to 1189 in the Liao dynasty with additions during the Yuan dynasty. The Liaoyang White Pagoda sits in Baita Park within Baita district in the centre of the city. Next to the park is Guangyou Temple, one of the oldest and largest temple complexes in the north east of China covering some 60,000 square metres (650,000 sq ft).

Under the Jurchen Jin dynasty, the city served as their empire's eastern capital under the name Dongjing (東京).

In the 17th century, the Manchu people rose up against the Ming dynasty of China. Liaoyang was one of the first Ming cities to fall and Nurhaci, the new Emperor of the Later Jin dynasty, made his capital there naming the city Dongjing in 1621. He also moved the tombs of several family members to Liaoyang and they can still be seen in Dongjingling, just east of the city. As the Manchu expanded, they again moved the capital to Shenyang in 1625. After this Dongjing faded in importance. Today, remains of the city walls can still be seen and a small museum stands within the reconstructed south gate.

The year 1900 saw the Boxer Rebellion in China. Russian troops camped in Liaoyang city, burning the ancient Guangyou temple. On the August 24 September 1904, the Battle of Liaoyang took place. This was a major battle of the Russo-Japanese War.

Liaoyang was one of the major centres of the Manchurian revival, a Protestant Christian revival which took place in Mukden (Shenyang) and the surrounding countryside in 1908.

The city was the site of widespread labor protests in March 2002 that were sparked by the bankruptcy and subsequent liquidation of the Liaoyang Ferroalloy Factory, or Liaotie. The protesters were workers from at least seven different factories, including failing textile, chemical, piston, instruments, leather, and precision tool plants. Their grievances involved local government corruption and widespread worker layoffs coupled with arrearage in employee wages, pensions and unemployment benefits. The activists demanded compensation for what they were owed, an investigation into the bankruptcy of Liaotie, and the resignation of the chairman of the local legislature, Gong Shangwu. The protests were eventually dispersed after several days by the government after declaring a curfew under martial law. Two of the workers' representatives, Xiao Yunliang and Yao Fuxin, were given prison terms of four and seven years, respectively. The government also responded by paying most but not all of the money that the workers were owed and requited, and by ordering an investigation into the charges of corruption at Liaotie which culminated in the arrest and thirteen-year prison sentence of its manager, Fan Yicheng, for smuggling and fraudulent dereliction of duty. The provincial governor who approved the Liaotie bankruptcy was also imprisoned for accepting bribes, but Gong Shangwu evaded punitive action.

== Administrative divisions ==
Within Liaoyang prefecture there are one county, five districts and one county-level city.

Map
#	Name	Chinese	Hanyu Pinyin	Population (2020)	Area (km^{2})	Density (/km^{2})
1	Baita District	白塔区	Báitǎ Qū	359,401	30	12,138
2	Wensheng District	文圣区	Wénshèng Qū	160,466	287	559
3	Hongwei District	宏伟区	Hóngwěi Qū	142,491	164	868
4	Gongchangling District	弓长岭区	Gōngchánglǐng Qū	80,870	288	238
5	Taizihe District	太子河区	Tàizǐhé Qū	134,604	269	482
6	Dengta City	灯塔市	Dēngtǎ Shì	354,617	1,331	304
7	Liaoyang County	辽阳县	Liáoyáng Xiàn	372,131	2,853	152

== Geography and climate ==
Climate data for Liaoyang, elevation 25 m (82 ft), (1991–2020 normals, extremes 1981–present)
Month	Jan	Feb	Mar	Apr	May	Jun	Jul	Aug	Sep	Oct	Nov	Dec	Year
Record high °C (°F)	9.3 (48.7)	18.0 (64.4)	27.3 (81.1)	29.8 (85.6)	37.4 (99.3)	37.0 (98.6)	36.2 (97.2)	37.7 (99.9)	33.2 (91.8)	29.4 (84.9)	21.2 (70.2)	13.2 (55.8)	37.7 (99.9)
Mean daily maximum °C (°F)	−3.6 (25.5)	1.1 (34.0)	8.3 (46.9)	17.6 (63.7)	24.3 (75.7)	28.0 (82.4)	29.9 (85.8)	29.1 (84.4)	24.9 (76.8)	17.1 (62.8)	6.9 (44.4)	−1.1 (30.0)	15.2 (59.4)
Daily mean °C (°F)	−9.8 (14.4)	−4.8 (23.4)	2.7 (36.9)	11.6 (52.9)	18.4 (65.1)	22.8 (73.0)	25.4 (77.7)	24.3 (75.7)	18.6 (65.5)	10.7 (51.3)	1.4 (34.5)	−6.8 (19.8)	9.5 (49.2)
Mean daily minimum °C (°F)	−15.1 (4.8)	−10.3 (13.5)	−2.8 (27.0)	5.4 (41.7)	12.4 (54.3)	17.5 (63.5)	21.1 (70.0)	19.9 (67.8)	12.8 (55.0)	4.8 (40.6)	−3.6 (25.5)	−11.8 (10.8)	4.2 (39.5)
Record low °C (°F)	−35.6 (−32.1)	−34.9 (−30.8)	−19.8 (−3.6)	−12.1 (10.2)	−2.1 (28.2)	5.4 (41.7)	12.5 (54.5)	8.3 (46.9)	−0.3 (31.5)	−8.9 (16.0)	−24.7 (−12.5)	−27.1 (−16.8)	−35.6 (−32.1)
Average precipitation mm (inches)	6.6 (0.26)	9.8 (0.39)	16.2 (0.64)	34.5 (1.36)	61.2 (2.41)	94.2 (3.71)	153.6 (6.05)	178.4 (7.02)	61.0 (2.40)	46.3 (1.82)	26.3 (1.04)	11.5 (0.45)	699.6 (27.55)
Average precipitation days (≥ 0.1 mm)	3.4	3.2	4.4	6.7	9.2	10.8	12.0	11.2	7.1	6.5	5.5	4.0	84
Average snowy days	4.9	4.4	4.0	1.1	0	0	0	0	0	0.5	4.3	5.3	24.5
Average relative humidity (%)	61	54	49	47	52	64	75	77	71	64	62	62	62
Mean monthly sunshine hours	164.7	178.4	218.5	224.5	248.6	213.6	182.4	189.4	218.4	196.2	151.0	146.4	2,332.1
Percentage possible sunshine	55	59	59	56	55	47	40	45	59	58	51	51	53
Source: China Meteorological Administrationall-time May and August (and all time extreme) temperature

== Tourism ==
The largest park within the city is Baita park. There are several historical sites to be visited. The new Liaoyang Museum, open to the public since 2009, contains many antiques. Guangyou temple beside the Baita (White Pagoda) has become one of Liaoyang's main tourism attraction in recent years. The first temple on the site dates back to 1145. The temple was destroyed by Russian troops during the 1900 Boxer Rebellion but was later rebuilt. It houses a giant statue of Buddha made from sandalwood. There are two small museums for famous Liaoyang residents: Cao Xueqin, author of the book Dreams of a Red Mansion, and Wang Erlie, a notable Qing dynasty official. There is also a small museum just outside the city on the site of Dongjing, the old capital city. Gongchangling County, just east of the main city is noted for its hot spring resort, golf course and ski centre. Outdoor activities include the Tanghe River, Shenwo Reservoir Scenic Area and rafting on the Taizi river. In the downtown area busy shopping malls can be found. The shopping area includes a total of five malls and pedestrianized streets with many Chinese domestic brand name stores. On the streets, there are many interesting and delicious regional snacks. Within the shopping area are two streets with many Korean BBQ restaurants (Er-dao jie, Xingyun da jie).

== Military ==
Liaoyang is the headquarters of the 39th Mechanized Group Army of the People's Liberation Army, one of the three group armies that comprise the Shenyang Military Region responsible for defending China's northeastern borders with Russia and North Korea.

== Twin towns – sister cities ==
Liaoyang is twinned with:

- Los Gatos, California, United States
- Joliet, Illinois, United States
- Haman, Gyeongsangnam-do, South Korea

== Notable residents ==
- Cao Xueqin, the author of Dream of the Red Chamber (红楼梦; hóng lóu mèng)
- Toshiko Akiyoshi (秋吉 敏子 / 穐吉 敏子, Akiyoshi Toshiko), Japanese jazz pianist, born in Liaoyang in 1929
- Wang Junfeng, President of the All China Lawyers Association
