= Taihe District =

Taihe 太和区
- District
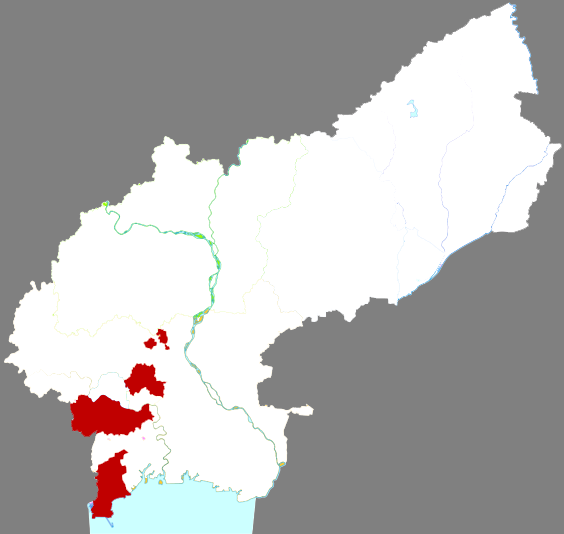
- Location in Jinzhou
- Coordinates: 41°06′34″N 121°06′14″E
- Country: China
- Province: Liaoning
- Prefecture-level city: Jinzhou
- District seat: Taihe Subdistrict

Area
  - Total: 727.68 km^{2} (280.96 sq mi)

Population (2020 census)
  - Total: 175,098
  - Density: 240.63/km^{2} (623.22/sq mi)
- Time zone: UTC+8 (China Standard)
- Website: www.jzth.gov.cn

Taihe District (simplified Chinese: 太和区; traditional Chinese: 太和區; pinyin: Tàihé Qū) is a district of the city of Jinzhou, Liaoning, China.

== Administrative divisions ==
There are 10 subdistricts within the district:

Taihe Subdistrict (太和街道), Daxue Subdistrict (大薛街道), Xinmin Subdistrict (新民街道), Yingpan Subdistrict (营盘街道), Nü'erhe Subdistrict (女儿河街道), Tianqiao Subdistrict (天桥街道), Xingshan Subdistrict (杏山街道), Niangnianggong Subdistrict (娘娘宫街道), Lingnan Subdistrict (凌南街道), Songshan Subdistrict (松山街道).
