= Linghe District =

Linghe 凌河区
- District
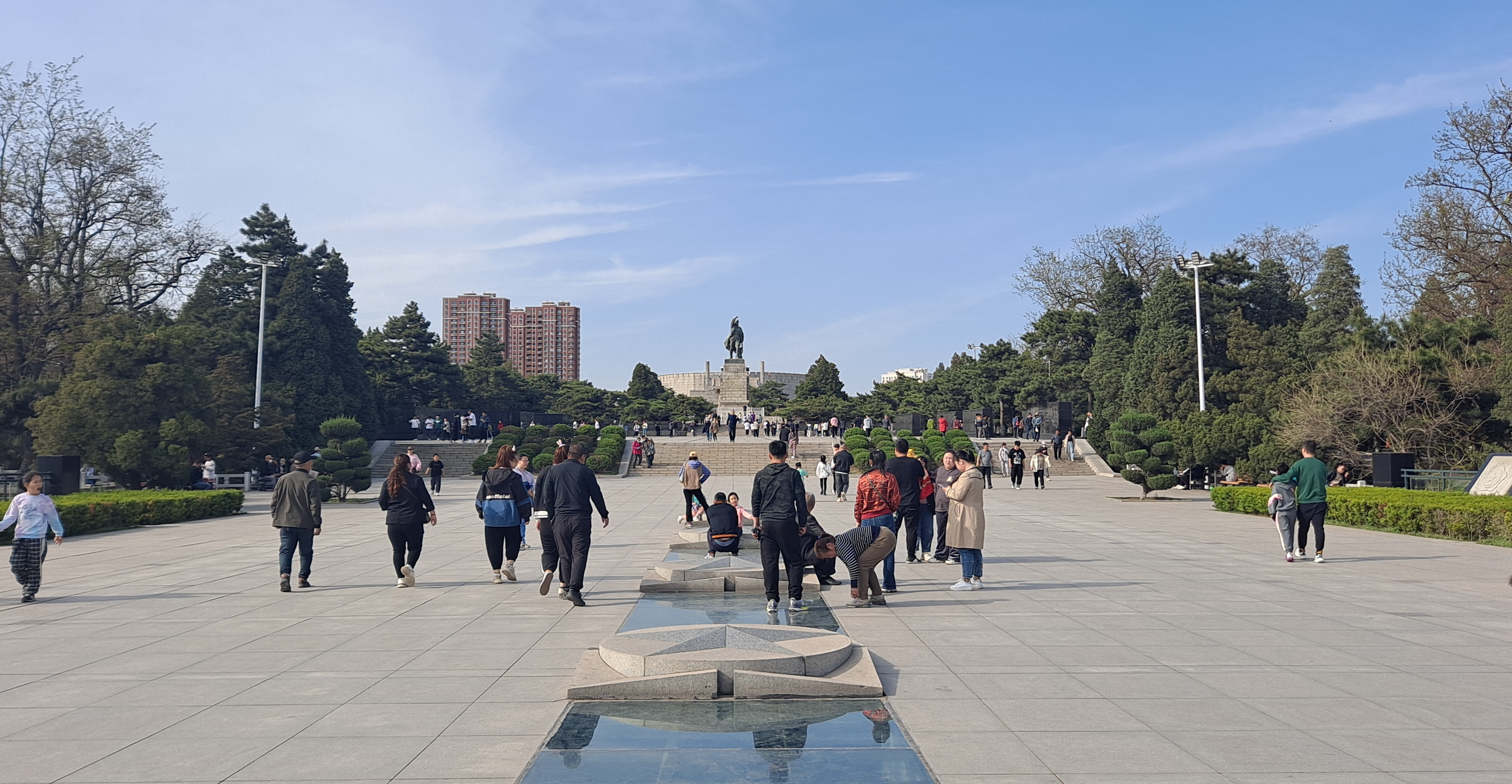

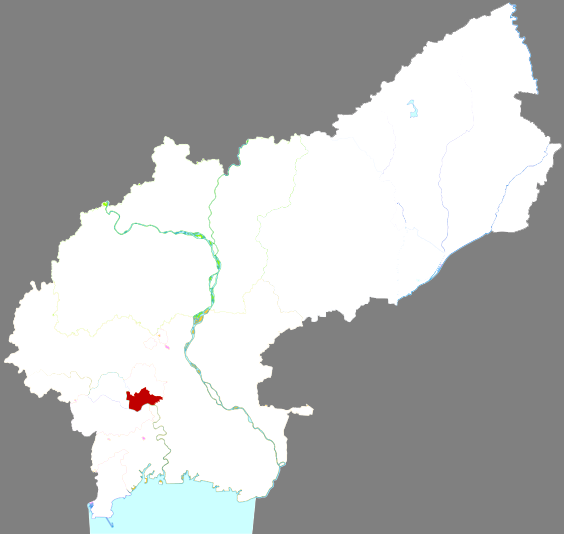
- Location in Jinzhou

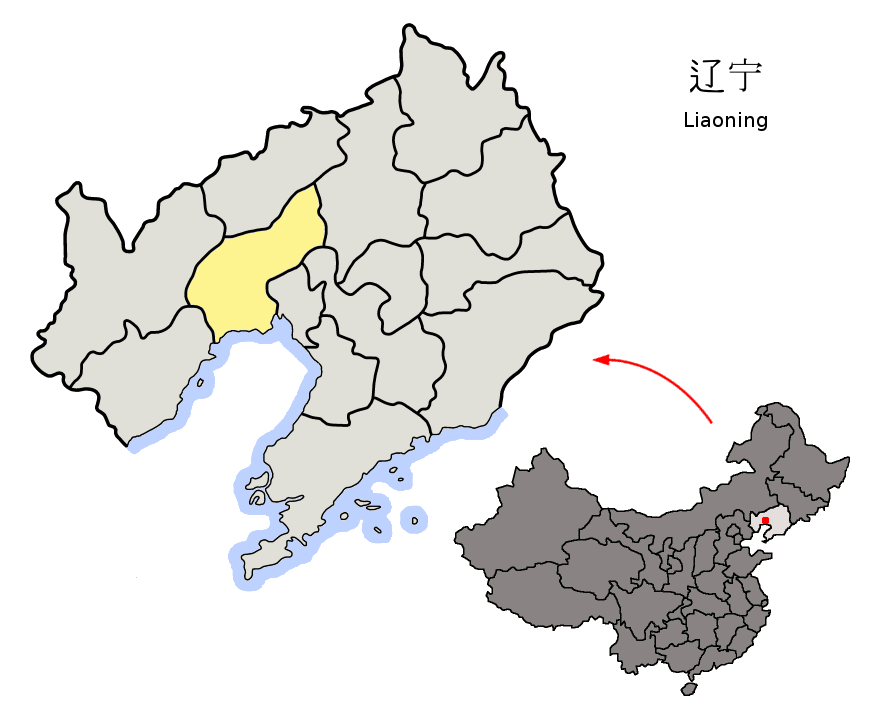
- Jinzhou in Liaoning
- Coordinates: 41°06′54″N 121°09′03″E
- Country: People's Republic of China
- Province: Liaoning
- Prefecture-level city: Jinzhou

Area
  - Total: 40.27 km^{2} (15.55 sq mi)

Population (2020 census)
  - Total: 402,038
  - Density: 9,984/km^{2} (25,860/sq mi)
- Time zone: UTC+8 (China Standard)

Linghe District (simplified Chinese: 凌河区; traditional Chinese: 淩河區; pinyin: Línghé Qū) is a district of the city of Jinzhou, Liaoning, People's Republic of China.

== Administrative divisions ==
There are 11 subdistricts within the district.

Subdistricts:

- Zhengda Subdistrict (正大街道), Longjiang Subdistrict (龙江街道), Majia Subdistrict (马家街道), Baigu Subdistrict (百股街道), Tiexin Subdistrict (铁新街道), Kangning Subdistrict (康宁街道), Ling'an Subdistrict (凌安街道), Juyuan Subdistrict (菊园街道), Jintie Subdistrict (锦铁街道), Liuhua Subdistrict (榴花街道), Shiqiaozi Subdistrict (石桥子街道)
