= Gongchangling District =

Gongchangling 弓长岭区
- District
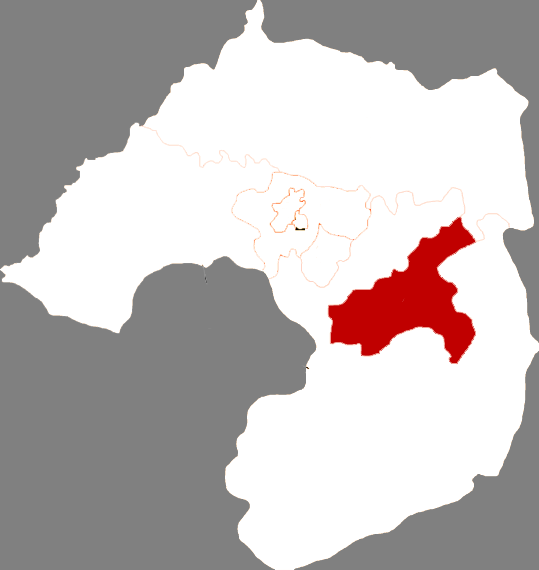
- Location in Liaoyang

- Location in Liaoning
- Coordinates: 41°09′00″N 123°25′12″E
- Country: People's Republic of China
- Province: Liaoning
- Prefecture-level city: Liaoyang

Area
  - Total: 340.2 km^{2} (131.4 sq mi)

Population (2020)
  - Total: 80,870
  - Density: 237.7/km^{2} (615.7/sq mi)
- Time zone: UTC+8 (China Standard)

Gongchangling District (simplified Chinese: 弓长岭区; traditional Chinese: 弓長嶺區; pinyin: Gōngchánglǐng Qū) is a district of Liaoyang City, Liaoning Province, People's Republic of China.

== Administrative divisions ==
There are two subdistricts, one town, and one township within the district.

Subdistricts:

- Tuanshanzi Subdistrict (团山子街道), Anping Subdistrict (安平街道), Sujia Subdistrict (苏家街道)

The only town is Tanghe (汤河镇)

The only township is Anping Township (安平乡)
