= Hongwei District =

Coordinates: 41°13′05″N 123°11′49″E

Hongwei 宏伟区
- District
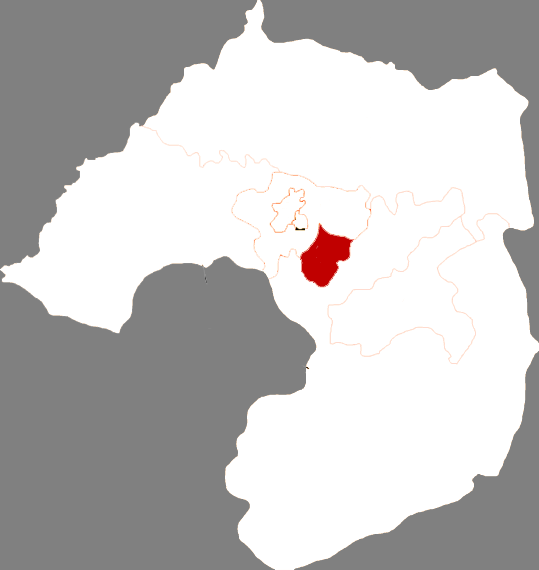
- Hongwei in Liaoyang

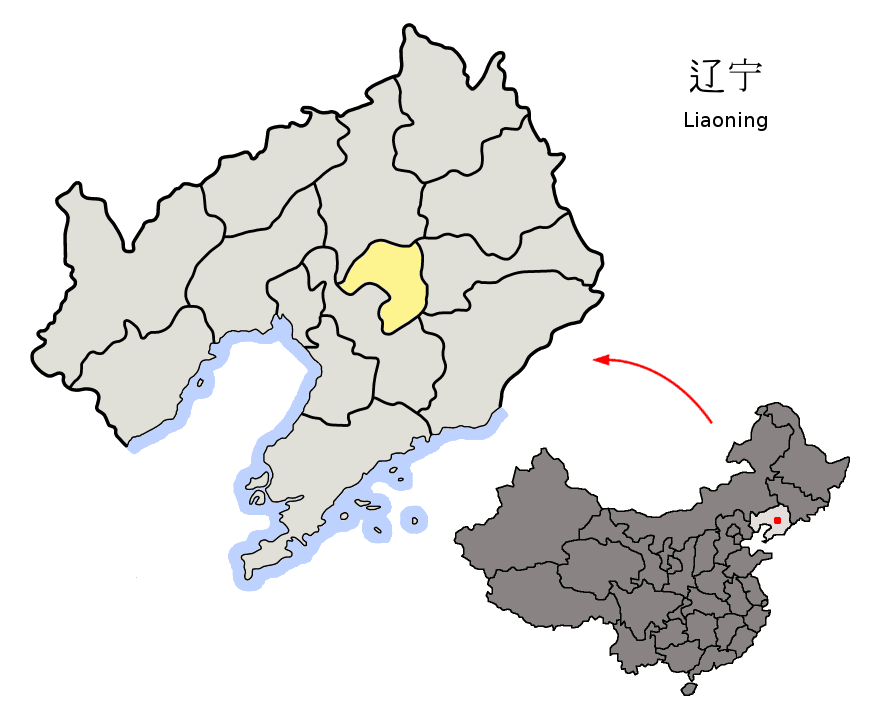
- Liaoyang in Liaoning
- Country: People's Republic of China
- Province: Liaoning
- Prefecture-level city: Liaoyang

Area
  - Total: 164.2 km^{2} (63.4 sq mi)

Population (2020 census)
  - Total: 142,491
  - Density: 867.8/km^{2} (2,248/sq mi)
- Time zone: UTC+8 (China Standard)

Hongwei District (simplified Chinese: 宏伟区; traditional Chinese: 宏偉區; pinyin: Hóngwěi Qū; lit. 'Magnificent District') is a district of Liaoyang City, Liaoning province, People's Republic of China.

== Administrative Divisions ==
There are four subdistricts and one town within the district.

Subdistricts:

- Changzheng Subdistrict (长征街道), Xincun Subdistrict (新村街道), Gongnong Subdistrict (工农街道), Guanghua Subdistrict (光华街道)

The only town is Shuguang (曙光镇)
