= Xinqiu District =

Coordinates: 42°05′11″N 121°47′38″E

Xinqiu 新邱区
- District
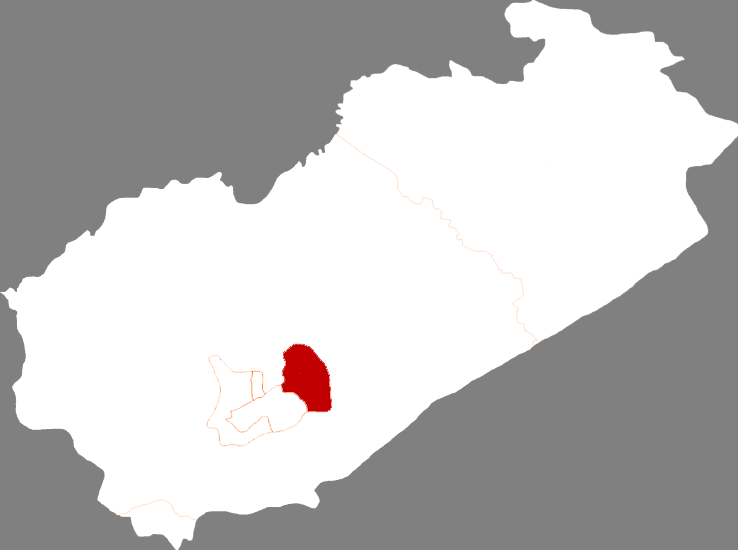
- Xinqiu in Fuxin

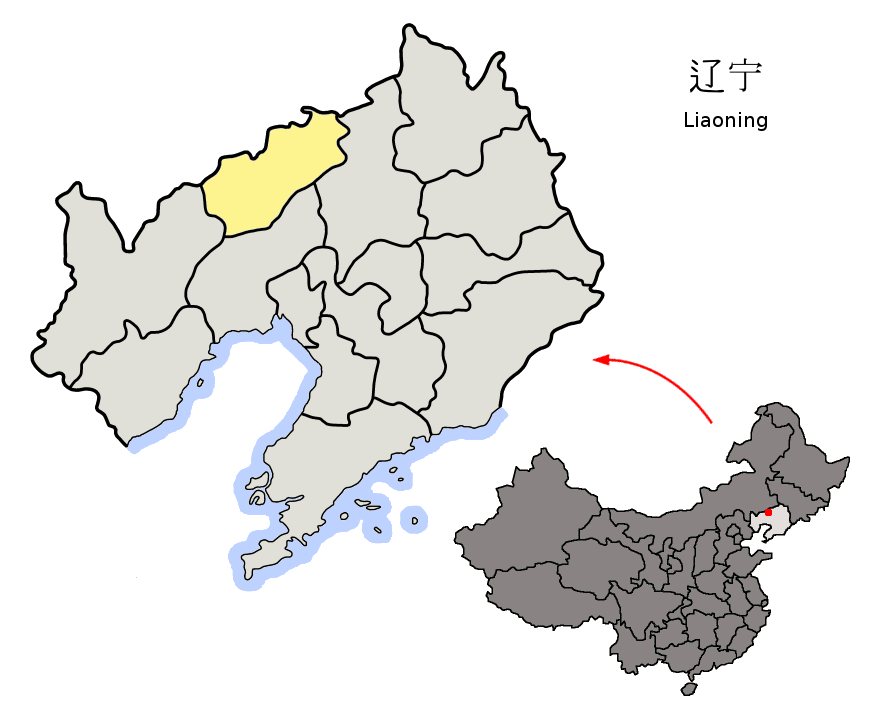
- Fuxin in Liaoning
- Country: People's Republic of China
- Province: Liaoning
- Prefecture-level city: Fuxin

Area
  - Total: 122.4 km^{2} (47.3 sq mi)

Population (2020 census)
  - Total: 66,769
  - Density: 545.5/km^{2} (1,413/sq mi)
- Time zone: UTC+8 (China Standard)

Xinqiu District (simplified Chinese: 新邱区; traditional Chinese: 新邱區; pinyin: Xīnqiū Qū) is a district of the city of Fuxin, Liaoning province, People's Republic of China.

== Administrative divisions ==
There are four subdistricts and one town within the district.

Subdistricts:

- Jieji Subdistrict (街基街道), Beibu Subdistrict (北部街道), Zhongbu Subdistrict (中部街道), Nanbu Subdistrict (南部街道)

The only town is Changyingzi (长营子镇)
