= Taiping District, Fuxin =

Coordinates: 42°00′39″N 121°40′43″E

Taiping 太平区
- District
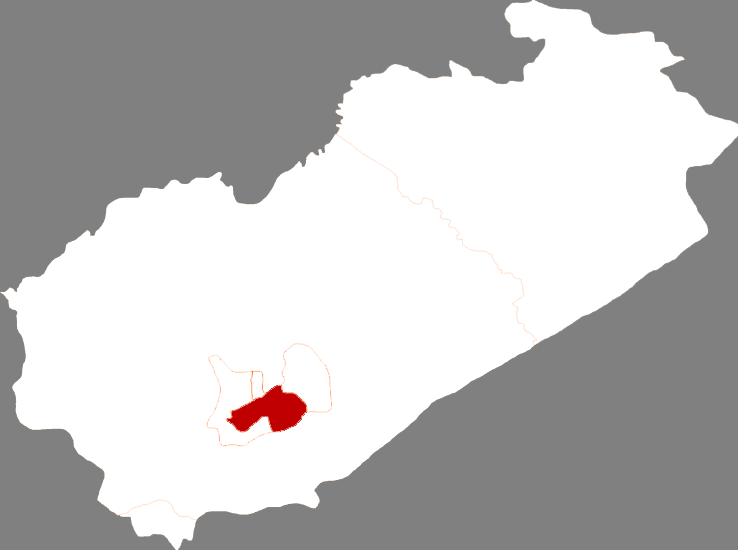
- Taiping in Fuxin

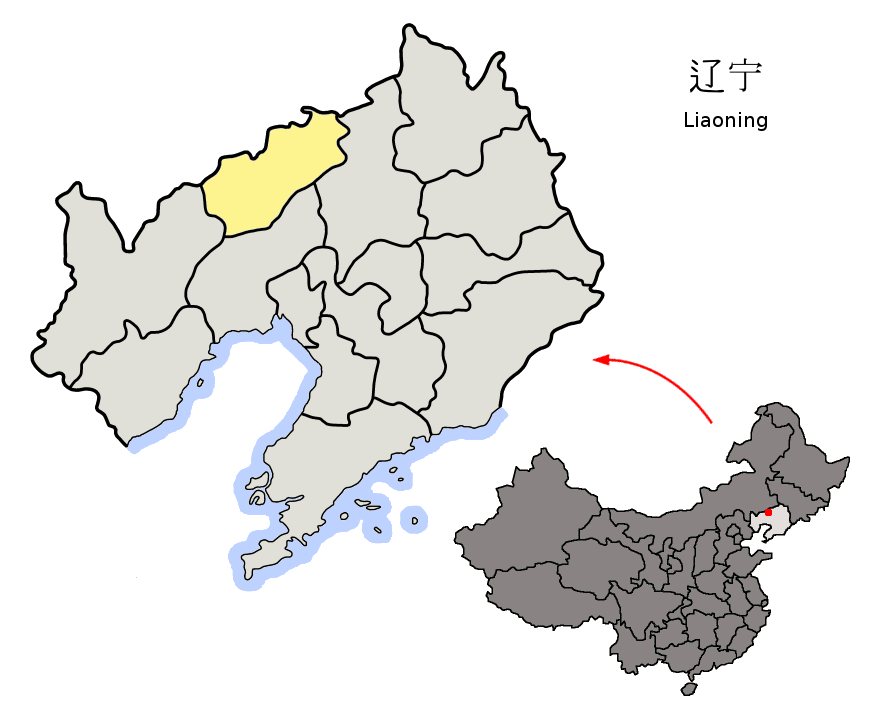
- Fuxin in Liaoning
- Country: People's Republic of China
- Province: Liaoning
- Prefecture-level city: Fuxin

Area
  - Total: 94.73 km^{2} (36.58 sq mi)

Population (2020 census)
  - Total: 142,171
  - Density: 1,501/km^{2} (3,887/sq mi)
- Time zone: UTC+8 (China Standard)

Taiping District (simplified Chinese: 太平区; traditional Chinese: 太平區; pinyin: Tàipíng Qū) is a district of the city of Fuxin, Liaoning province, People's Republic of China.

== Administrative divisions ==
There are five subdistricts and one town within the district.

Subdistricts:

- Hongshu Subdistrict (红树街道), Meihai Subdistrict (煤海街道), Gaode Subdistrict (高德街道), Chengnan Subdistrict (城南街道), Sunjiawan Subdistrict (孙家湾街道)

The only town is Shuiquan (水泉镇)
