= Qinghemen District =

Coordinates: 41°46′40″N 121°25′38″E

Qinghemen 清河门区
- District
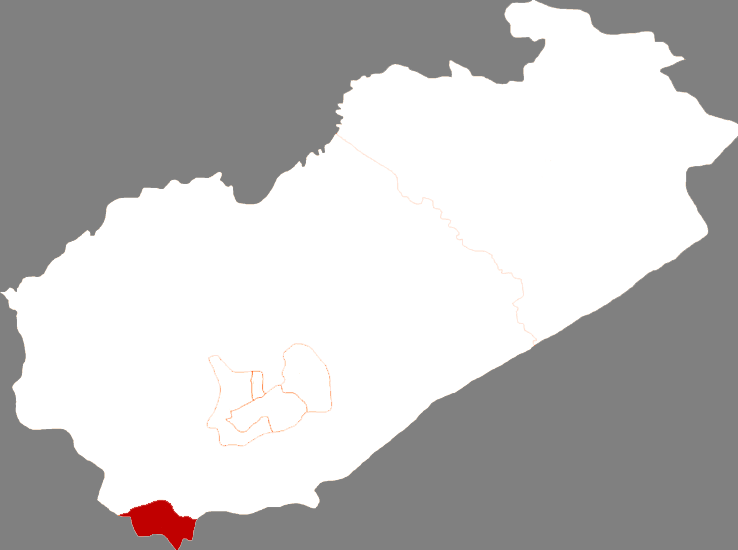
- Qinghemen in Fuxin

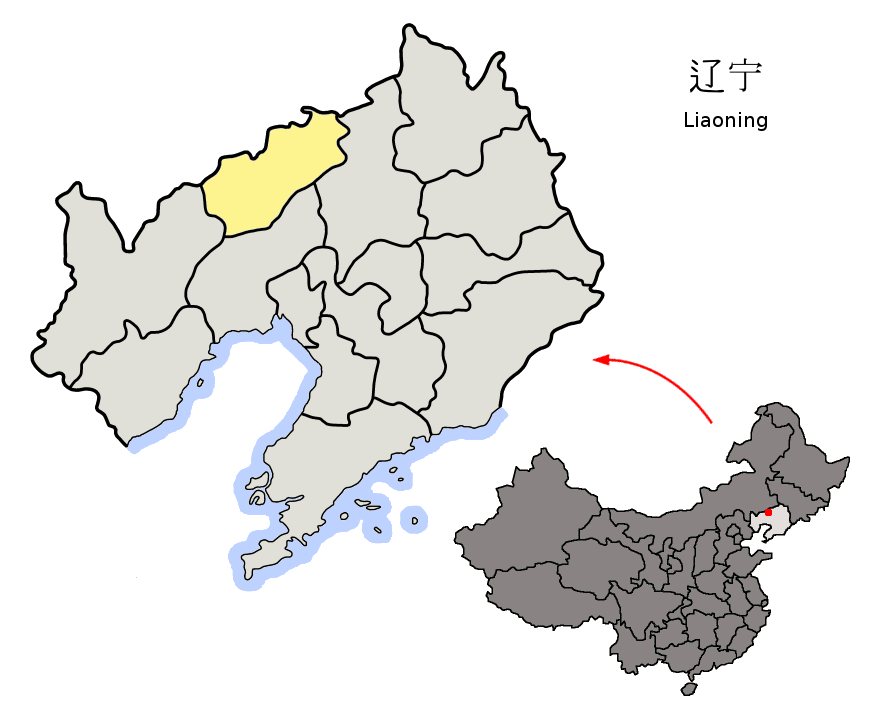
- Fuxin in Liaoning
- Country: People's Republic of China
- Province: Liaoning
- Prefecture-level city: Fuxin

Area
  - Total: 92.55 km^{2} (35.73 sq mi)

Population (2020 census)
  - Total: 51,394
  - Density: 555.3/km^{2} (1,438/sq mi)
- Time zone: UTC+8 (China Standard)

Qinghemen District (simplified Chinese: 清河门区; traditional Chinese: 清河門區; pinyin: Qīnghémén Qū) is a district of Fuxin City, Liaoning province, People's Republic of China.

== Administrative divisions ==
There are four subdistricts and two towns within the district.

Subdistricts:

- Xinbei Subdistrict (新北街道), Liutai Subdistrict (六台街道), Aiyou Subdistrict (艾友街道), Qinghe Subdistrict (清河街道)

Towns:

- Wulongba (乌龙坝镇), Hexi (河西镇)
