= Guta District =

Guta 古塔区
- District
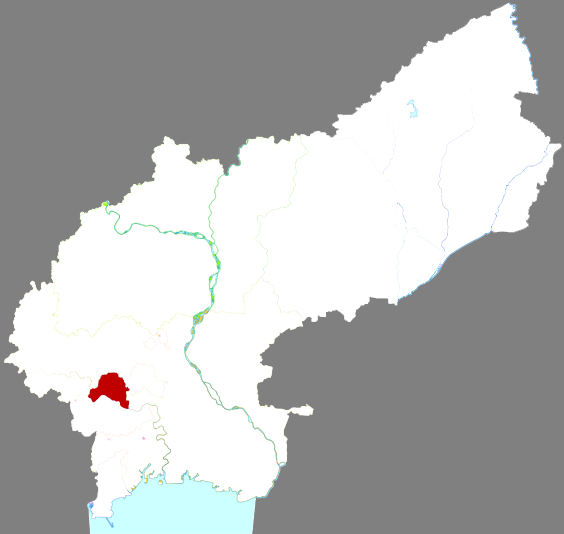
- Location in Jinzhou

- Location in Liaoning
- Coordinates: 41°09′31″N 121°09′37″E
- Country: People's Republic of China
- Province: Liaoning
- Prefecture-level city: Jinzhou

Area
  - Total: 69.98 km^{2} (27.02 sq mi)

Population (2020 census)
  - Total: 252,209
  - Density: 3,604/km^{2} (9,334/sq mi)
- Time zone: UTC+8 (China Standard)

Guta District (simplified Chinese: 古塔区; traditional Chinese: 古塔區; pinyin: Gǔtǎ Qū) is a district of the city of Jinzhou, Liaoning, People's Republic of China.

== Administrative divisions ==
There are nine subdistricts within the district.

Subdistricts:

- Tian'an Subdistrict (天安街道), Shiyou Subdistrict (石油街道), Beijie Subdistrict (北街街道), Bao'an Subdistrict (保安街道), Raoyang Subdistrict (饶阳街道), Nanjie Subdistrict (南街街道), Zhanqian Subdistrict (站前街道), Jingye Subdistrict (敬业街道), Shiying Subdistrict (士英街道)
