= Fuxin =

Fuxin 阜新市
- Prefecture-level city
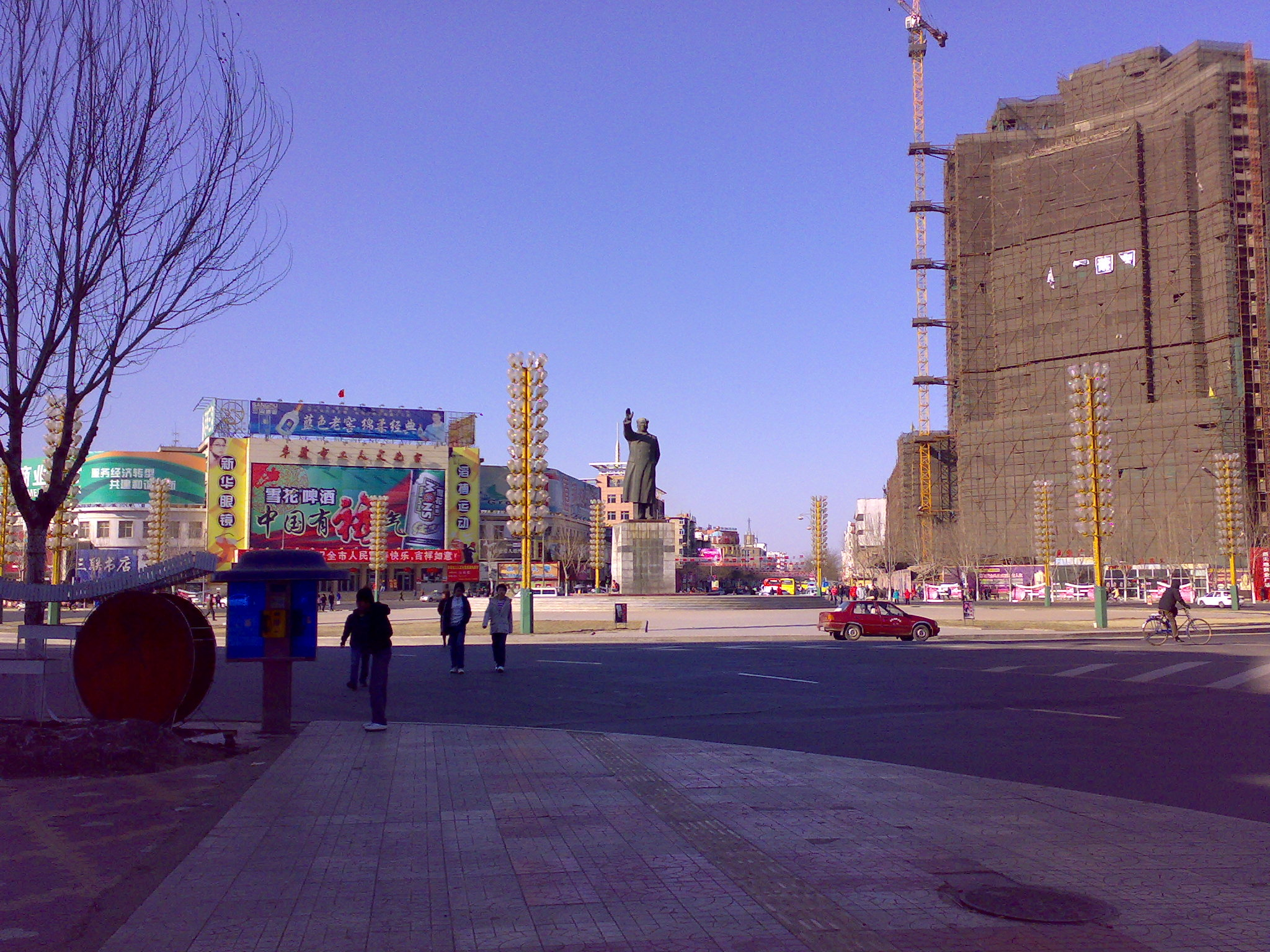

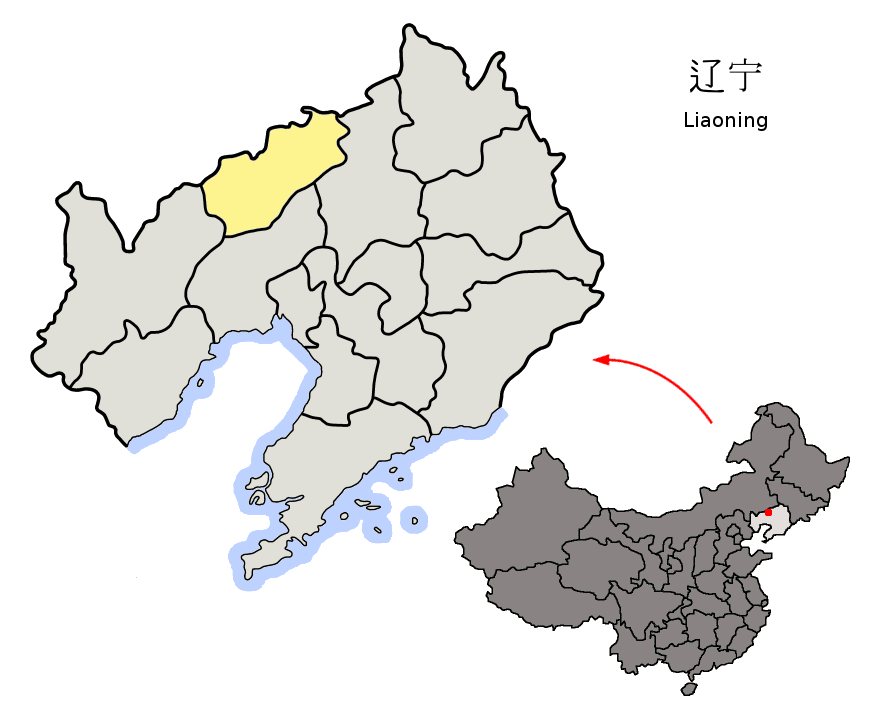
- Location of Fuxin City jurisdiction in Liaoning

- Location of the city centre in Liaoning
- Coordinates (Fuxin municipal government): 42°01′19″N 121°40′12″E
- Country: People's Republic of China
- Province: Liaoning
- Municipal seat: Xihe District
- Districts and Counties: List: Haizhou District; Xinqiu District; Taiping District; Qinghemen District; Xihe District; Zhangwu County; Fuxin Mongol Autonomous County

Government
  - CPC Fuxin: Committee Secretary
  - Mayor: Qi Jihui (齐继慧)

Area
  - Prefecture-level city: 10,316.85 km^{2} (3,983.36 sq mi)
  - Urban: 388.3 km^{2} (149.9 sq mi)

Population (2020 census)
  - Prefecture-level city: 1,647,280
  - Density: 159.669/km^{2} (413.541/sq mi)
  - Urban: 767,888
  - Urban density: 1,978/km^{2} (5,122/sq mi)
  - Metro: 716,494

GDP
  - Prefecture-level city: CN¥ 52.5 billion US$ 8.4 billion
  - Per capita: CN¥ 29,491; US$ 4,735
- Time zone: UTC+8 (China Standard)
- Postal code: 123000
- Area code: 0418
- ISO 3166 code: CN-LN-09
- Licence plates: 辽J
- Administrative division code: 210900
- Website: www.fuxin.gov.cn

Fuxin (Chinese: 阜新; pinyin: Fùxīn) is a prefecture-level city in northwestern Liaoning province, People's Republic of China, bordering the Inner Mongolia Autonomous Region to the north. As of the 2020 census, its decreasing total population was 1,647,280 inhabitants (contrast to 1,819,339 in 2010), of whom 716,494 lived in the built-up (or metro) area, encompassing the four urban districts, collectively known as 'Fuxin City'.

== Administration ==
Fuxin has direct administration over 7 county-level divisions: 5 districts, 1 county and 1 autonomous county:

Map
#	Name	Chinese	Hanyu Pinyin	Xiao'erjing	Population (2003 est.)	Area (km^{2})	Density (/km^{2})
1	Haizhou District	海州区	Hǎizhōu Qū	هَيْجِوْ ٿُوُ	280,000	97	2,887
2	Xinqiu District	新邱区	Xīnqiū Qū	ثٍٿِوْ ٿُوُ	90,000	128	703
3	Taiping District	太平区	Tàipíng Qū	تَيْپْي ٿُوُ	180,000	108	1,667
4	Qinghemen District	清河门区	Qīnghémén Qū	ٿْيحَعْمعٍ ٿُوُ	70,000	105	667
5	Xihe District	细河区	Xìhé Qū	ثِحَع ٿُوُ	160,000	126	1,270
6	Zhangwu County	彰武县	Zhāngwǔ Xiàn	جْاءُ ثِیًا	420,000	3,635	116
7	Fuxin Mongol Autonomous County	阜新蒙古族自治县	Fùxīn Měnggǔzú Zìzhìxiàn	فوثٍ مغول ظْجْ‌ثِیًا	730,000	6,246	117

== Geography and climate ==
Fuxin has a monsoon-influenced humid continental climate (Köppen Dwa), with long, cold but dry winters and hot, humid summers. A majority of the annual precipitation falls in July and August alone.

Climate data for Fuxin, elevation 168 m (551 ft), (1991–2020 normals, extremes 1981–present)
Month	Jan	Feb	Mar	Apr	May	Jun	Jul	Aug	Sep	Oct	Nov	Dec	Year
Record high °C (°F)	9.3 (48.7)	17.6 (63.7)	22.8 (73.0)	33.2 (91.8)	37.5 (99.5)	40.6 (105.1)	40.9 (105.6)	37.1 (98.8)	34.7 (94.5)	31.0 (87.8)	19.8 (67.6)	14.0 (57.2)	40.9 (105.6)
Mean daily maximum °C (°F)	−3.7 (25.3)	0.9 (33.6)	8.2 (46.8)	17.4 (63.3)	24.5 (76.1)	28.2 (82.8)	29.8 (85.6)	29.0 (84.2)	24.8 (76.6)	16.6 (61.9)	5.8 (42.4)	−2.0 (28.4)	15.0 (58.9)
Daily mean °C (°F)	−10.8 (12.6)	−6.3 (20.7)	1.4 (34.5)	10.5 (50.9)	17.9 (64.2)	22.4 (72.3)	24.7 (76.5)	23.3 (73.9)	17.6 (63.7)	9.3 (48.7)	−0.8 (30.6)	−8.6 (16.5)	8.4 (47.1)
Mean daily minimum °C (°F)	−16.6 (2.1)	−12.5 (9.5)	−5.1 (22.8)	3.5 (38.3)	11.2 (52.2)	16.7 (62.1)	20.0 (68.0)	18.2 (64.8)	10.8 (51.4)	2.7 (36.9)	−6.3 (20.7)	−14.0 (6.8)	2.4 (36.3)
Record low °C (°F)	−26.5 (−15.7)	−25.4 (−13.7)	−21.0 (−5.8)	−8.8 (16.2)	−0.1 (31.8)	5.0 (41.0)	12.8 (55.0)	5.0 (41.0)	−1.1 (30.0)	−10.6 (12.9)	−19.8 (−3.6)	−27.1 (−16.8)	−27.1 (−16.8)
Average precipitation mm (inches)	2.1 (0.08)	2.2 (0.09)	7.2 (0.28)	21.4 (0.84)	47.0 (1.85)	85.5 (3.37)	120.0 (4.72)	119.2 (4.69)	35.3 (1.39)	27.0 (1.06)	11.7 (0.46)	2.8 (0.11)	481.4 (18.94)
Average precipitation days (≥ 0.1 mm)	1.9	1.9	2.6	4.9	7.4	11.0	10.9	10.5	5.6	4.7	3.0	2.2	66.6
Average snowy days	2.8	2.8	2.7	1.1	0	0	0	0	0	0.5	2.6	3.4	15.9
Average relative humidity (%)	51	45	42	42	48	63	75	76	67	59	55	54	56
Mean monthly sunshine hours	196.5	203.0	247.8	242.7	274.8	242.9	221.1	231.5	245.4	228.3	185.8	176.9	2,696.7
Percentage possible sunshine	67	68	67	60	61	53	48	55	66	67	64	63	62
Source 1: China Meteorological Administration October all-time Records
Source 2: Weather China

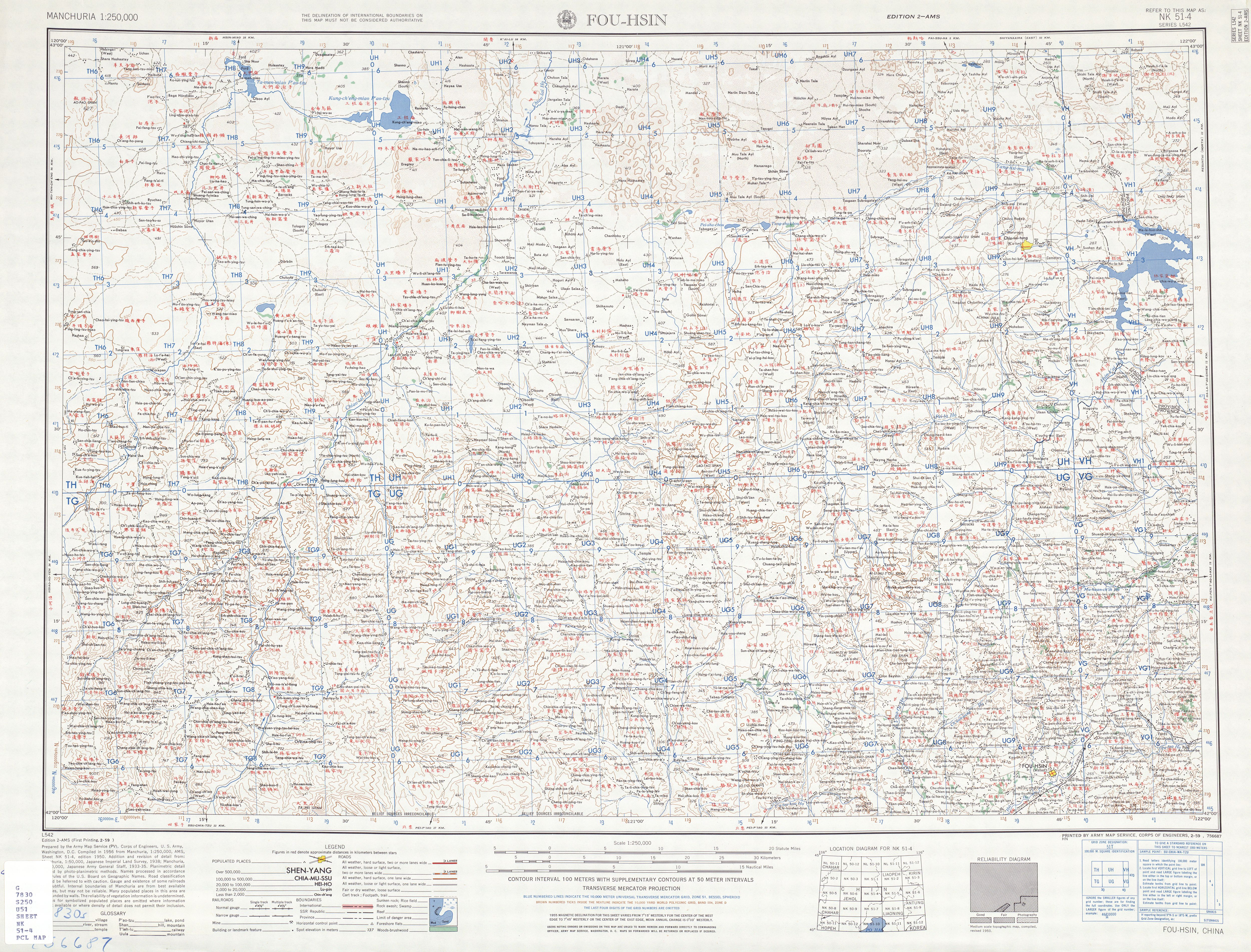
Map including Fuxin (labeled as FOU-HSIN (walled) 阜新) (AMS, 1956)

== Economy ==
Fuxin is a mining center in an agricultural region, producing mostly coal and agate. Fuxin is known as China's 'Agate City', with 50% of the nation's known deposits of the mineral being located there. The city also accounts for more than 90% of the country's agate products.

The city suffers from the over-mining of coal, which is low in supply while fundamental to Fuxin's economy. As the coal mines run dry, Fuxin is trying to find other industries to keep its economy going. Measures taken have included the development of a part of the city as a 'Special Economic Zone', by which the city hopes to attract international investment.

Fuxin was identified as the first city in mainland China with exhausted resources in 2001. Similarly to Hegang, Heilongjiang, where house prices were too low for years, 'cabbage-priced' houses in Fuxin, Liaoning Province, also came under scrutiny in 2020. According to reports by China Business Network and Securities Times, many houses have prices lower than 75 dollars per sqm even for a house with all the necessary furniture. https://stock.stcn.com/djjd/202008/t20200817_2229969.html

=== Foreign Investment in 2009 ===
In 2009, Fuxin approved 25 foreign funded enterprises and 2 joint-venture projects. The total value of the contracted funds in these investments exceeded US$143 million. and the foreign direct investment for that year reached US$64.12 million, up 24% over the previous year. This sum exceeded the Liaoning provincial target for foreign investment by 17%. In addition, in 7 of the projects, contracted funds were in excess of ten million dollars.

Foreign Direct Investment has enabled the development of new key industries to replace mining. The key industries have made new breakthroughs in foreign direct investment. The Wind Power Industry, which accounted for more than 70% of the total amount of FDI in 2009, has become the main focus of the whole city's FDI.

== Education ==
- Liaoning Technical University
- Fuxin College

== Transportation ==
Fuxin is served by the China National Highway 101, which connects Beijing to Shenyang. G25 Changchun–Shenzhen Expressway makes Fuxin into NTHS system. The G2512 Fuxin–Jinzhou Expressway connects Jinzhou and Fuxin.

As regards rail transport, Fuxin is well-connected to the major cities in North and Northeastern China, such as Beijing, Tianjin and Shenyang by a number of trains.

The city is also now connected to Shanghai and the booming Chinese East coast region by a train that runs directly between Shanghai and Fuxin.

== Sister city ==
- Gary, Indiana, United States

== See also ==
- 2005 Sunjiawan mine disaster
