= Nanfen District =

Nanfen District 南芬区
- District
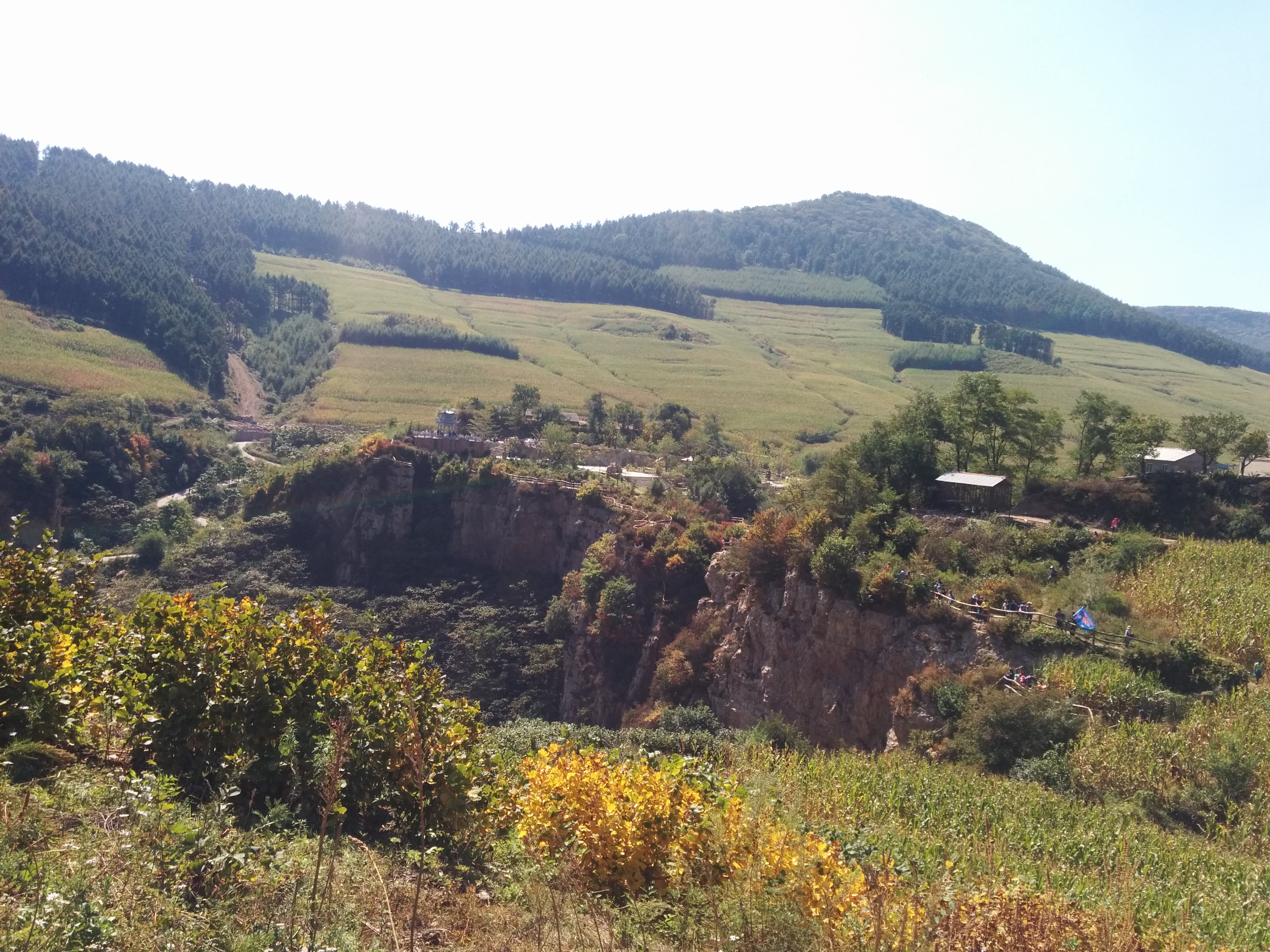

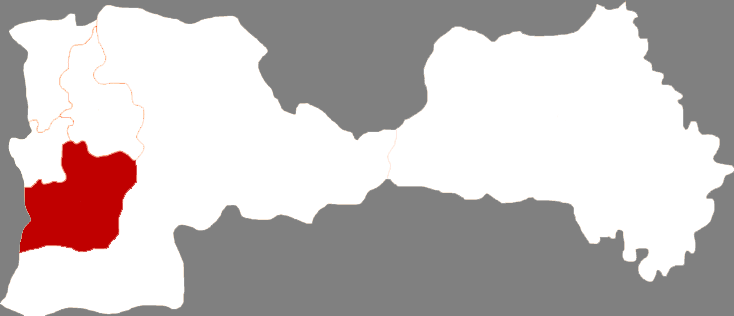
- Nanfen in Benxi

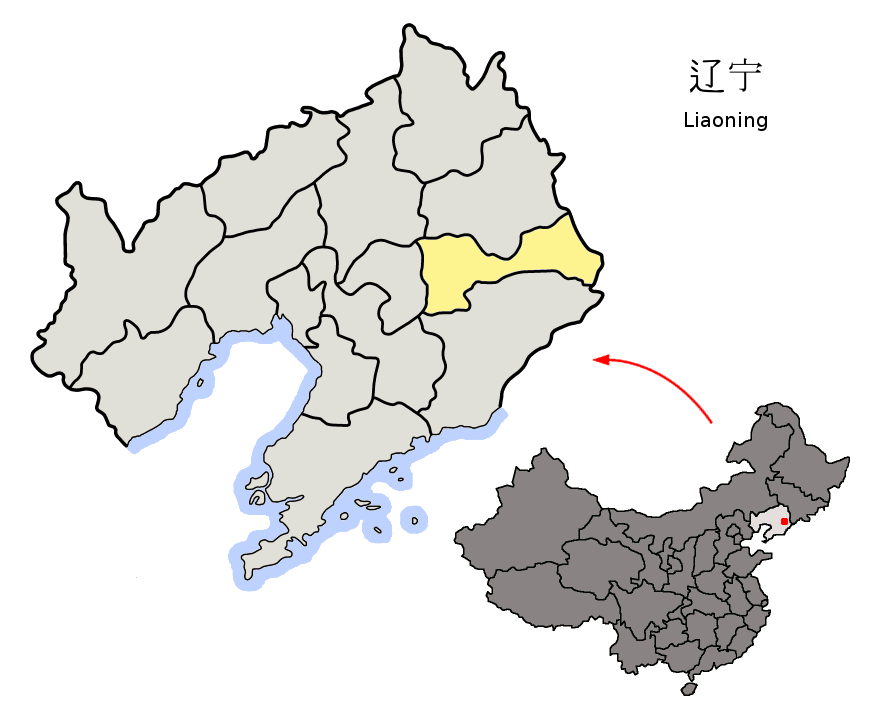
- Benxi in Liaoning
- Coordinates: 41°06′01″N 123°44′41″E
- Country: People's Republic of China
- Province: Liaoning
- Prefecture-level city: Benxi

Area
  - Total: 615.4 km^{2} (237.6 sq mi)

Population (2020 census)
  - Total: 55,560
  - Density: 90.28/km^{2} (233.8/sq mi)
- Time zone: UTC+8 (China Standard)

Nanfen District (simplified Chinese: 南芬区; traditional Chinese: 南芬區; pinyin: Nánfēn Qū) is a district under the administration of the city of Benxi, Liaoning province, People's Republic of China. It has a total area of 619 square kilometres (239 sq mi), and a population of approximately 55,500 people as of 2020.

== Administrative divisions ==
There are two subdistricts and one town in the district.

Subdistricts:

- Tieshan Subdistrict (铁山街道), Nanfen Subdistrict (南芬街道)

The only town is Xiamatang (下马塘镇)

Townships:

- Nanfen Township (南芬乡), Sishanling Manchu Ethnic Township (思山岭满族乡)
