= Pingshan District, Benxi =

Pingshan District 平山区
- District
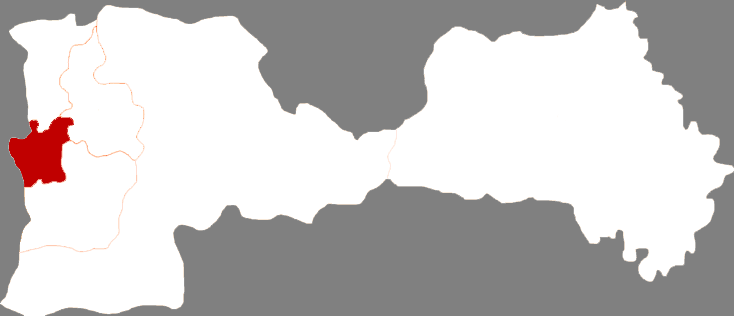
- Pingshan in Benxi

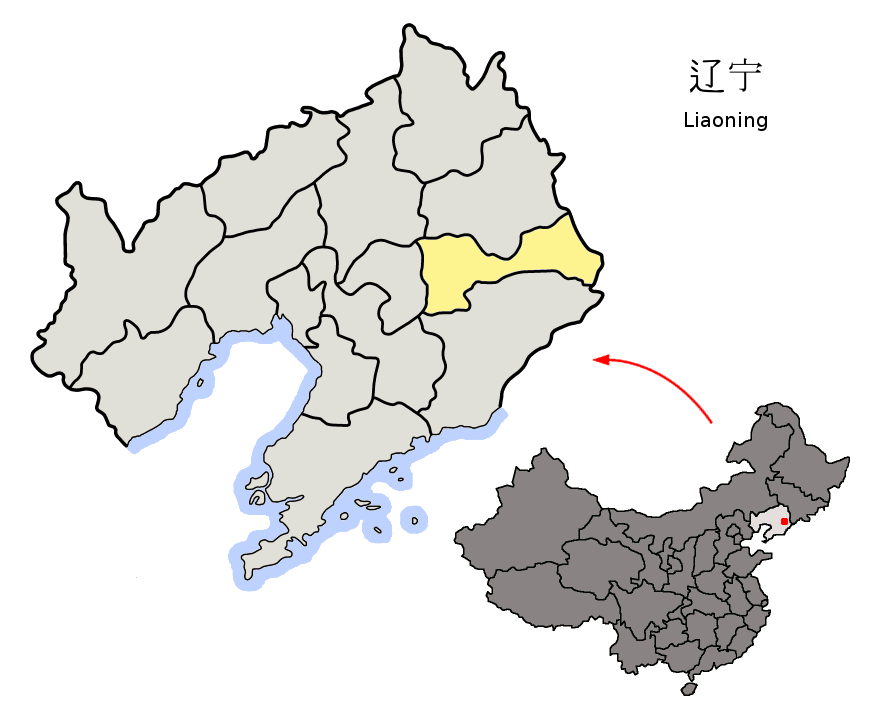
- Benxi in Liaoning
- Coordinates: 41°18′00″N 123°46′08″E
- Country: China
- Province: Liaoning
- Prefecture-level city: Benxi
- District seat: Dongming Subdistrict

Area
  - Total: 178.42 km^{2} (68.89 sq mi)

Population (2020 census)
  - Total: 226,059
  - Density: 1,267.0/km^{2} (3,281.5/sq mi)
- Time zone: UTC+8 (China Standard)
- Website: www.pingshan.gov.cn

Pingshan District (simplified Chinese: 平山区; traditional Chinese: 平山區; pinyin: Píngshān Qū; lit. 'flat or peaceful mountain') is a district under the administration of the city of Benxi, Liaoning province, China. It has a total area of 177 square kilometres (68 sq mi), and a population of approximately 350,000 people as of 2002.

== Administrative divisions ==
There are 7 subdistricts in the district.

Dongming Subdistrict (东明街道), Pingshan Subdistrict (平山街道), Cuidong Subdistrict (崔东街道), Zhanqian Subdistrict (站前街道), Qianjin Subdistrict (千金街道), Nandi Subdistrict (南地街道), Beitai Subdistrict (北台街道)
