= Xinglongtai District =

Xinglongtai District 兴隆台区
- District
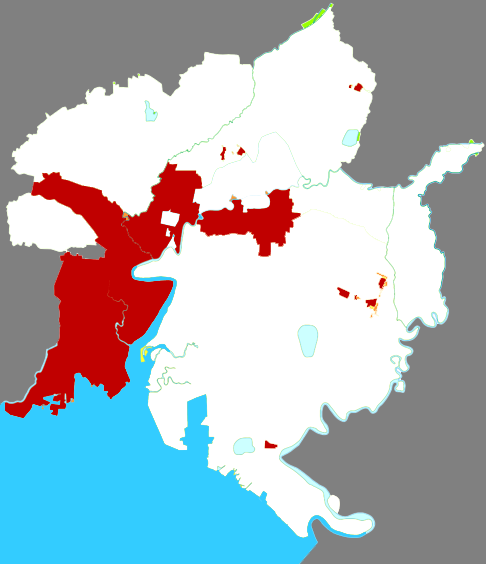
- Xinglongtai in Panjin

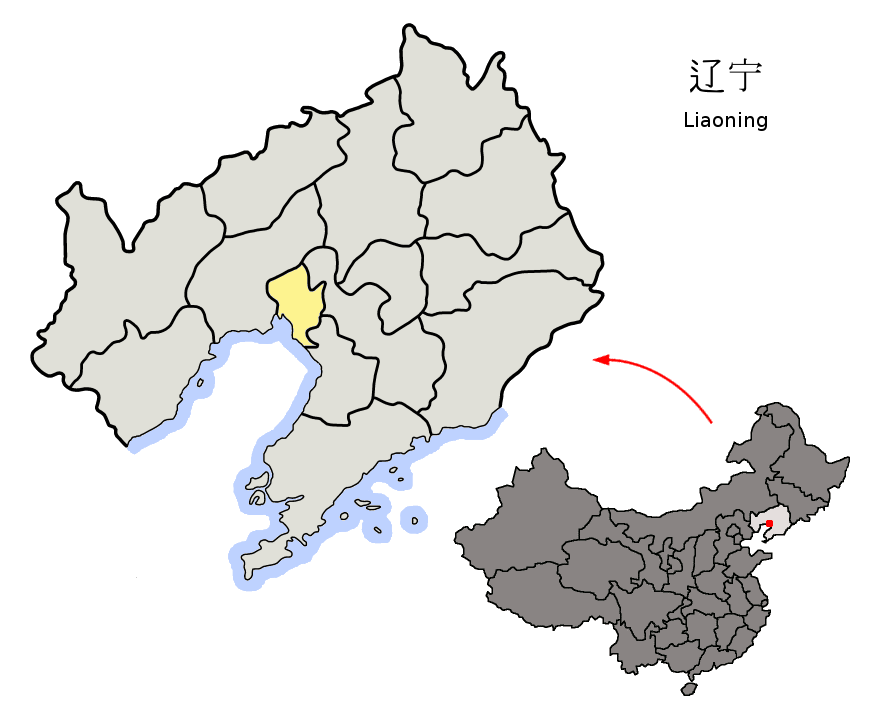
- Panjin in Liaoning
- Coordinates: 41°09′31″N 122°04′12″E
- Country: China
- Province: Liaoning
- Prefecture-level city: Panjin
- District seat: Chuangxin Subdistrict

Area
  - Total: 888.07 km^{2} (342.89 sq mi)

Population (2020 census)
  - Total: 529,394
  - Density: 596.12/km^{2} (1,543.9/sq mi)
- Time zone: UTC+8 (China Standard)
- Website: www.xlt.gov.cn

Xinglongtai District (simplified Chinese: 兴隆台区; traditional Chinese: 興隆台區; pinyin: Xīnglóngtái Qū) is a district under the administration of the city of Panjin, Liaoning province, China. It has a total area of 194 square kilometres (75 sq mi) with many small exclaves in other districts, and a population of approximately 530,000 people in 2020. The district's postal code is 124010, and the district government is located on Shiyou Street.

== Administrative divisions ==
Xinglongtai District administers 13 subdistricts:

Zhenxing Subdistrict (振兴街道), Xinglong Subdistrict (兴隆街道), Bohai Subdistrict (渤海街道), Xingong Subdistrict (新工街道), Shuguang Subdistrict (曙光街道), Huanxiling Subdistrict (欢喜岭街道), Shencai Subdistrict (沈采街道), Chuangxin Subdistrict (创新街道), Xingsheng Subdistrict (兴盛街道), Xinghai Subdistrict (兴海街道), Huibin Subdistrict (惠宾街道).
