= Yuanbao District =

Coordinates: 40°09′09″N 124°22′52″E

Yuanbao 元宝区
- District
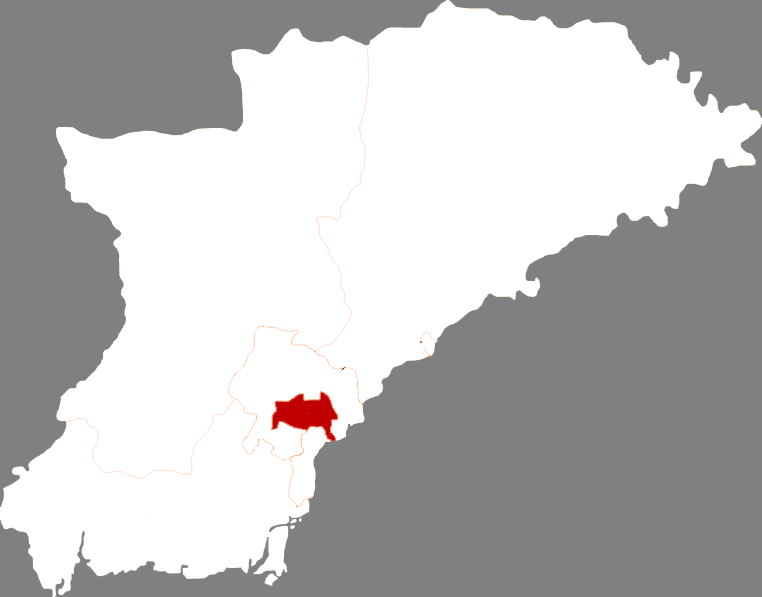
- Yuanbao in Dandong

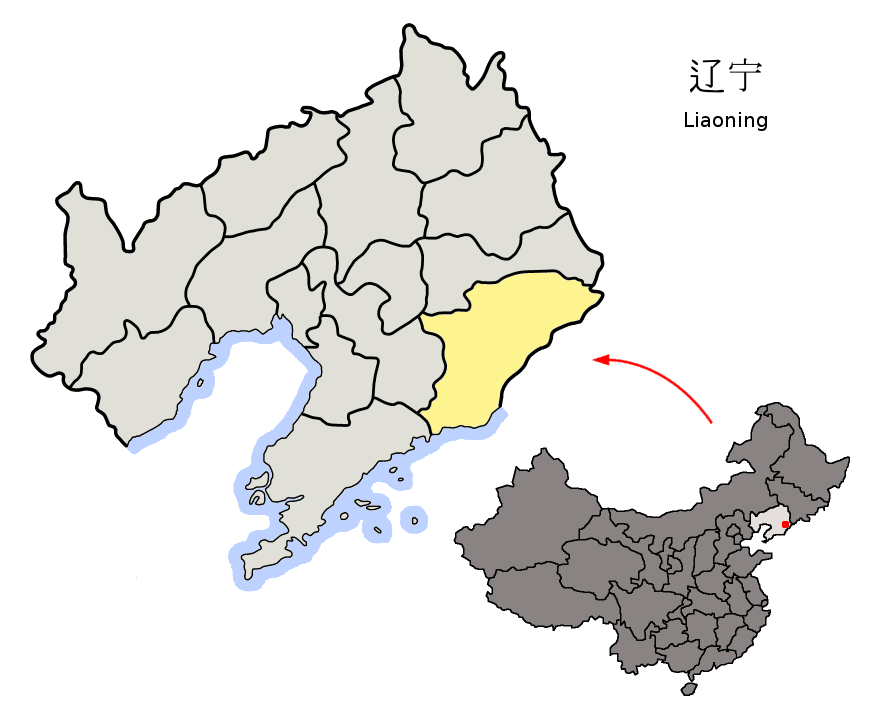
- Dandong in Liaoning
- Country: People's Republic of China
- Province: Liaoning
- Prefecture-level city: Dandong

Area
  - Total: 90.94 km^{2} (35.11 sq mi)

Population (2020 census)
  - Total: 202,325
  - Density: 2,225/km^{2} (5,762/sq mi)
- Time zone: UTC+8 (China Standard)

Yuanbao District (simplified Chinese: 元宝区; traditional Chinese: 元寶區; pinyin: Yuánbǎo Qū) is a district of the city of Dandong, Liaoning, People's Republic of China.

== Administrative Divisions ==
There are six subdistricts and one town in the district.

Subdistricts:

- Liudaokou Subdistrict (六道口街道), Qidao Subdistrict (七道街道), Badao Subdistrict (八道街道), Jiudao Subdistrict (九道街道), Guangji Subdistrict (广济街道), Xingdong Subdistrict (兴东街道)

The only town is Jinshan (金山镇).
