= Gongnong =

Gongnong (Chinese: 工农; lit. 'Workers and Peasants') may refer to these places in China:

- Gongnong District, a district of Hegang, Heilongjiang
- Gongnong, Guangyuan, a town in Guangyuan, Sichuan

== Townships ==
- Gongnong Township, Heilongjiang, in Tieli, Heilongjiang
- Gongnong Township, Jilin, in Liaoyuan, Jilin

== Subdistricts ==
- Gongnong Subdistrict, Zhanjiang, in Xiashan District, Zhanjiang, Guangdong
- Gongnong Subdistrict, Harbin, in Daoli District, Harbin, Heilongjiang
- Gongnong Subdistrict, Luoyang, in Jianxi District, Luoyang, Henan
- Gongnong Subdistrict, Songyuan, in Ningjiang District, Songyuan, Jilin
- Gongnong Subdistrict, Fushun, in Wanghua District, Fushun, Liaoning
- Gongnong Subdistrict, Liaoyang, in Hongwei District, Liaoyang, Liaoning
- Gongnong Subdistrict, Deyang, in Jingyang District, Deyang, Sichuan
