= List of township-level divisions of Liaoning =

Location of Liaoning province in China

This is a list of township-level divisions of the province of Liaoning, People's Republic of China (PRC). After province, prefecture, and county-level divisions, township-level divisions constitute the formal fourth-level administrative divisions of the PRC. There are a total of 1,502 such divisions in Liaoning, divided into 526 subdistricts, 585 towns, 4 ethnic towns, 313 townships, and 74 ethnic townships. This list is divided first into the prefecture-level divisions then the county-level divisions.

== Shenyang ==
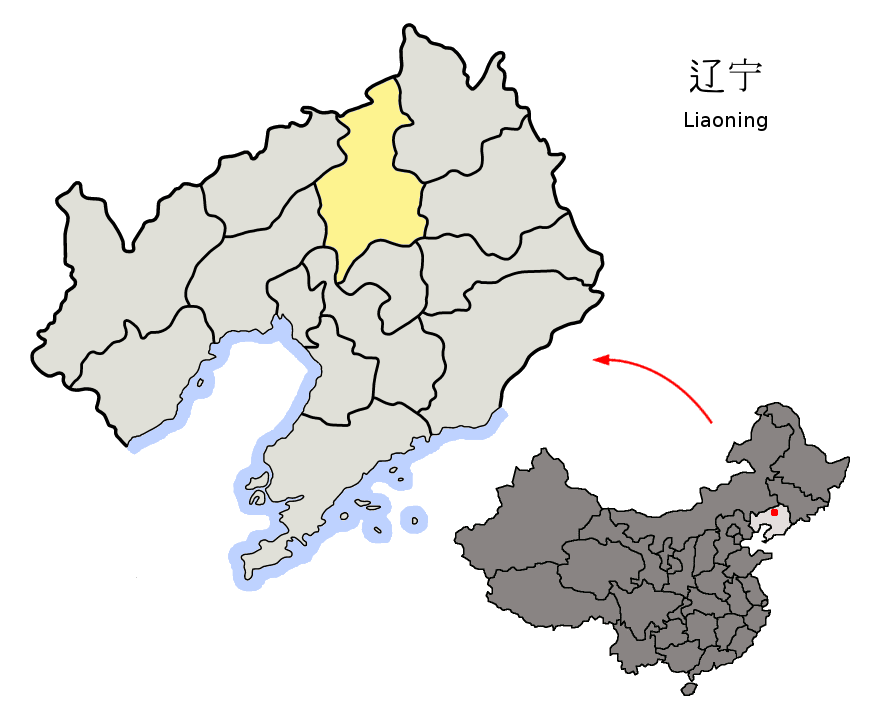
Location of Shenyang in the province

=== Dadong District ===
Subdistricts:

- Wanquan Subdistrict (万泉街道), Guancheng Subdistrict (管城街道), Chang'an Subdistrict (长安街道), Dongta Subdistrict (东塔街道), Xindong Subdistrict (新东街道), Zhulin Subdistrict (珠林街道), Xiaodong Subdistrict (小东街道), Xiaojinqiao Subdistrict (小津桥街道), Dabei Subdistrict (大北街道), Xiaobei Subdistrict (小北街道), Taochang Subdistrict (洮昌街道), Liaoshen Subdistrict (辽沈街道), Dongzhan Subdistrict (东站街道), Ertaizi Subdistrict (二台子街道), Wenguan Subdistrict (文官街道)

=== Dongling District ===
Subdistricts:

- Nanta Subdistrict (南塔街道), Quanyuan Subdistrict (泉园街道), Maguanqiao Subdistrict (马关桥街道), Fengle Subdistrict (丰乐街道), Huishan Subdistrict (辉山街道), Dongling Subdistrict (东陵街道), Yingda Subdistrict (英达街道), Qianjin Subdistrict (前进街道), Donghu Subdistrict (东湖街道), Wusan Subdistrict (五三街道), East Hunhe Station Subdistrict (浑河站东街道), West Hunhe Station Subdistrict (浑河站西街道)

Towns:

- Taoxian (桃仙镇), Gaokan (高坎镇), Zhujiatun (祝家屯镇), Shenjingzi (深井子镇), Lixiang (李相镇), Baita (白塔镇)

Townships:

- Wangbingou Township (王滨沟乡), Mantang Manchu Ethnic Township (满堂满族乡)

=== Heping District ===
Subdistricts:

- Nanzhan Subdistrict (南站街道), Yunji Subdistrict (云集街道), Minzhu Subdistrict (民主街道), Suichuan Subdistrict (遂川街道), Shengli Subdistrict (胜利街道), Xita Subdistrict (西塔街道), Xinxing Subdistrict (新兴街道), Nanhu Subdistrict (南湖街道), Maluwan Subdistrict (马路湾街道), Shashan Subdistrict (砂山街道), Beidaokou Subdistrict (北道口街道), Zhonghua Road Subdistrict (中华路街道), Xinhua Subdistrict (新华街道), Beizhan Subdistrict (北站街道), Jixian Subdistrict (集贤街道), Yuanlu Subdistrict (园路街道), Beishi Subdistrict (北市街道), Wusong Subdistrict (吴淞街道), Bajing Subdistrict (八经街道), Shisiwei Road Subdistrict (十四纬路街道), Changbai Subdistrict (长白街道)

=== Huanggu District ===
Subdistricts:

- Liaohe Subdistrict (辽河街道), Shouquan Subdistrict (寿泉街道), Santaizi Subdistrict (三台子街道), Minglian Subdistrict (明廉街道), Tawan Subdistrict (塔湾街道), Huanghe Subdistrict (黄河街道), Lingbei Subdistrict (陵北街道), Huashan Subdistrict (华山街道), Xinle Subdistrict (新乐街道), Sandongqiao Subdistrict (三洞桥街道), Shelita Subdistrict (舍利塔街道), Beita Subdistrict (北塔街道), Lingdong Subdistrict (陵东街道)

=== Shenhe District ===
Subdistricts:

- Xinbeizhan Subdistrict (新北站街道), Zhujianlu Subdistrict (朱剪炉街道), Huangcheng Subdistrict (皇城街道), Daxi Subdistrict (大西街道), Shandongmiao Subdistrict (山东庙街道), Fengyutan Subdistrict (风雨坛街道), Binhe Subdistrict (滨河街道), Wanlian Subdistrict (万莲街道), Danan Subdistrict (大南街道), Wulihe Subdistrict (五里河街道)

=== Sujiatun District ===
Subdistricts:

- Jiefang Subdistrict (解放街道), Tieyou Subdistrict (铁友街道), Minzhu Subdistrict (民主街道), Linhu Subdistrict (临湖街道), Zhongxing Subdistrict (中兴街道), Huxi Subdistrict (湖西街道), Chengjiao (城郊镇)

Towns:

- Chenxiangtun (陈相屯镇), Shilihe (十里河镇), Honglingpu (红菱堡镇), Linshengpu (林盛堡镇), Bayi (八一镇), Yaoqianhutun (姚千户屯镇), Shahebao (沙河堡镇)

Townships:

- Wanggangbao Township (王纲堡乡), Yongle Township (永乐乡), Baiqingzhai Township (白清寨乡), Tonggou Township (佟沟乡), Dagou Township (大沟乡)

=== Tiexi District, Shenyang ===
Subdistricts:

- Lingkong Subdistrict (凌空街道), Qinggong Subdistrict (轻工街道), Weigong Subdistrict (卫工街道), Seventh Road Subdistrict (七路街道), Twelfth Road Subdistrict (十二路街道), Luguan Subdistrict (路官街道), Qixian Subdistrict (齐贤街道), Xinggong Subdistrict (兴工街道), Qigong Subdistrict (启工街道), Jihong Subdistrict (霁虹街道), Chonggong Subdistrict (重工街道), Xinghua Subdistrict (兴华街道), Gongrencun Subdistrict (工人村街道), Guihe Subdistrict (贵和街道), Xingshun Subdistrict (兴顺街道), Yanfen Subdistrict (艳粉街道), Dugong Subdistrict (笃工街道), Xingqi Subdistrict (兴齐街道), Baogong Subdistrict (保工街道), Yunfeng Subdistrict (云峰街道)

=== Yuhong District ===
Subdistricts:

- Yingbin Road Subdistrict (迎宾路街道), Shenliao Road Subdistrict (沈辽路街道), Lingxi Subdistrict (陵西街道), Yuhong Subdistrict (于洪街道), Yangshi Subdistrict (杨士街道), Beiling Subdistrict (北陵街道), Lingdong Subdistrict (陵东街道), Shaling Subdistrict (沙岭街道), Nanyanghu Subdistrict (南阳湖街道), Chengdonghu Subdistrict (城东湖街道), Pingluo Subdistrict (平罗街道), Masanjia Subdistrict (马三家街道), Zaohua Subdistrict (造化街道), Guanghui Subdistrict (光辉街道)

=== Xinmin ===
Subdistricts:

- Dongcheng Subdistrict (东城街道), Xicheng Subdistrict (西城街道), Liaobin Subdistrict (辽滨街道), Xinliu Subdistrict (新柳街道), Xincheng Subdistrict (新城街道)

Towns:

- Dahongqi (大红旗镇), Liangshan (梁山镇), Daliutun (大柳屯镇), Gongzhutun (公主屯镇), Xinglong (兴隆镇), Xinglongbao (兴隆堡镇), Hutai (胡台镇), Fahaniu (法哈牛镇), Qiandangbao (前当堡镇), Damintun (大民屯镇), Liuhegou (柳河沟镇), Gaotaizi (高台子镇)

Townships:

- Jinwutaizi Township (金五台子乡), Hongqi Township (红旗乡), Lutun Township (卢屯乡), Yaobao Township (姚堡乡), Zhoutuozi Township (周坨子乡), Yujiawobao Township (于家窝堡乡), Xinnongcun Township (新农村乡), Dongsheshanzi Township (东蛇山子乡), Taotun Township (陶屯乡), Luojiafangzi Township (罗家房子乡), Sandaogangzi Township (三道岗子乡), Zhangjiatun Township (张家屯乡)

=== Faku County ===
Towns:

- Faku (法库镇), Yemaotao (叶茂台镇), Xiushuihezi (秀水河子镇), Dengshibaozi (登士堡子镇), Baijiagou (柏家沟镇), Dagujiazi (大孤家子镇), Sanmianchuan (三面船镇), Dingjiafang (丁家房镇)

Townships:

- Fengbeibao Township (冯贝堡乡), Ci'ensi Township (慈恩寺乡), Shuangtaizi Township (双台子乡), Woniushi Township (卧牛石乡), Heping Township (和平乡), Wutaizi Township (五台子乡), Shijianfang Township (十间房乡), Yiniubaozi Township (依牛堡子乡), Baojiatun Township (包家屯乡), Mengjia Township (孟家乡), Hongwuyue Township (红五月乡), Sijiazi Mongol Ethnic Township (四家子蒙古族乡)

=== Kangping County ===
Towns:

- Kangping (康平镇), Dongguantun (东关屯镇), Zhangqiang (张强镇), Xiaochengzi (小城子镇), Fangjiatun (方家屯镇), Haoguantun (郝官屯镇), Erniusuokou (二牛所口镇)

Townships:

- Liangjiazi Township (两家子乡), Beisijiazi Township (北四家子乡), Shandongtun Township (山东屯乡), Haizhouwobao Township (海洲窝堡乡), Shajintai Mongol and Manchu Ethnic Township (沙金台蒙古族满族乡), Liushutun Mongol and Manchu Ethnic Township (柳树屯蒙古族满族乡), Dongsheng Manchu and Mongol Ethnic Township (东升满族蒙古族乡), Xiguantun Manchu and Mongol Ethnic Township (西关屯满族蒙古族乡)

=== Liaozhong County ===
Towns:

- Liaozhong (辽中镇), Ciyutuo (茨榆坨镇), Yujiafang (于家房镇), Zhujiafang (朱家房镇), Lengzibao (冷子堡镇), Liu'erbao (刘二堡镇), Manduhu (满都户镇), Yangshigang (杨士岗镇), Xiaozhaimen (肖寨门镇), Chengjiao (城郊镇), Liujianfang (六间房镇), Yangshibao (养士堡镇), Panjiabao (潘家堡镇), Laoguantuo (老观坨镇)

Townships:

- Laodafang Township (老大房乡), Daheigangzi Township (大黑岗子乡), Niuxintuo Township (牛心坨乡)

== Dalian ==
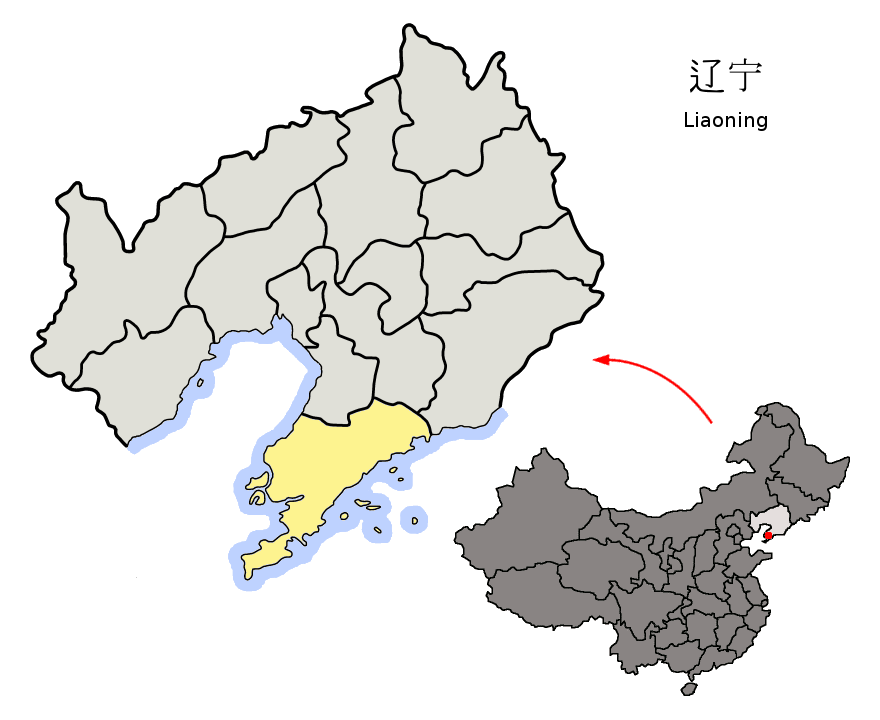
Location of Dalian in the province

=== Ganjingzi District ===
Subdistricts:

- Zhoushuizi Subdistrict (周水子街道), Jiaojinshan Subdistrict (椒金山街道), Ganjingzi Subdistrict (甘井子街道), Nanguanling Subdistrict (南关岭街道), Paoai Subdistrict (泡崖街道), Zhonghua Road Subdistrict (中华路街道), Airport Subdistrict (机场街道), Xinzhaizi Subdistrict (辛寨子街道), Hongqi Subdistrict (红旗街道), Lingshui Subdistrict (凌水街道), Dalianwan Subdistrict (大连湾街道), Quanshui Subdistrict (泉水街道), Gezhenpu Subdistrict (革镇堡街道), Yingchengzi Subdistrict (营城子街道), Qixianling Subdistrict (七贤岭街道)

=== Jinzhou District ===
Subdistricts:

- Yongzheng Subdistrict (拥政街道), Youyi Subdistrict (友谊街道), Guangzhong Subdistrict (光中街道), Maqiaozi Subdistrict (马桥子街道), Haiqingdao Subdistrict (海青岛街道), Dagushan Subdistrict (大孤山街道), Zhanqian Subdistrict (站前街道), Xianjin Subdistrict (先进街道), Dongjiagou Subdistrict (董家沟街道), Jinshitan Subdistrict (金石滩街道), Wanli Subdistrict (湾里街道), Ershilipu Subdistrict (二十里堡街道), Liangjiadian Subdistrict (亮甲店街道), Dengshahe Subdistrict (登沙河街道), Daweijia Subdistrict (大魏家街道), Xingshu Subdistrict (杏树街道), Qidingshan Subdistrict (七顶山街道), Huajia Subdistrict (华家街道), Xiangying Subdistrict (向应街道), Dalijia Subdistrict (大李家街道), Desheng Subdistrict (得胜街道), Paotai Subdistrict (炮台街道), Fuzhouwan Subdistrict (复州湾街道), Sanshilipu Subdistrict (三十里堡街道), Shihe Subdistrict (石河街道)

=== Lüshunkou District ===
Subdistricts:

- Dengfeng Subdistrict (登峰街道), Desheng Subdistrict (得胜街道), Shuishiying Subdistrict (水师营街道), Longwangtang Subdistrict (龙王塘街道), Tieshan Subdistrict (铁山街道), Shuangdaowan Subdistrict (双岛湾街道), Sanjianpu Subdistrict (三涧堡街道), Changcheng Subdistrict (长城街道), Longtou Subdistrict (龙头街道)

=== Pulandian District ===
Subdistricts:

- Fengrong Subdistrict (丰荣街道), Tiexi Subdistrict (铁西街道), Taiping Subdistrict (太平街道), Pikou Subdistrict (皮口街道), Chengzitan Subdistrict (城子坦街道), Daliujia Subdistrict (大刘家街道), Yangshufang Subdistrict (杨树房街道), Datan Subdistrict (大谭街道), Tangjiafang Subdistrict (唐家房街道), Lianshan Subdistrict (莲山街道), Anbo Subdistrict (安波街道), Shabao Subdistrict (沙包街道), Xingtai Subdistrict (星台街道), Mopan Subdistrict (墨盘街道), Tongyi Subdistrict (同益街道), Lejia Subdistrict (乐甲街道), Shuangta Subdistrict (双塔街道), Siping Subdistrict (四平街道)

=== Shahekou District ===
Subdistricts:

- Xi'an Road Subdistrict (西安路街道), Chunliu Subdistrict (春柳街道), Malan Subdistrict (马栏街道), Nanshahekou Subdistrict (南沙河口街道), Heishijiao Subdistrict (黑石礁街道), Lijia Subdistrict (李家街道), Xinghaiwan Subdistrict (星海湾街道)

=== Xigang District ===
Subdistricts:

- Xianglujiao Subdistrict (香炉礁街道), Rixin Subdistrict (日新街道), Bayi Road Subdistrict (八一路街道), People's Square Subdistrict (人民广场街道), Baiyun Subdistrict (白云街道),

=== Zhongshan District ===
Subdistricts:

- Navy Square Subdistrict (海军广场街道), Renmin Road Subdistrict (人民路街道), Qingniwaqiao Subdistrict (青泥洼桥街道), Kuiying Subdistrict (葵英街道), Taoyuan Subdistrict (桃源街道), Laohutan Subdistrict (老虎滩街道)

=== Wafangdian ===
Subdistricts:

- Xinhua Subdistrict (新华街道), Wenlan Subdistrict (文兰街道), Lingdong Subdistrict (岭东街道), Gongji Subdistrict (共济街道), Tiedong Subdistrict (铁东街道), Zhuhua Subdistrict (祝华街道), Gangdian Subdistrict (岗店街道), Taiyang Subdistrict (太阳街道), Changxingdao Subdistrict (长兴岛街道), Jiulong Subdistrict (九龙街道), Jiaoliudao Subdistrict (交流岛街道)

Towns:

- Fuzhoucheng (复州城镇), Songshu (松树镇), Delisi (得利寺镇), Wanjialing (万家岭镇), Xutun (许屯镇), Yongning (永宁镇), Xietun (谢屯镇), Laohutun (老虎屯镇), Hongyanhe (红沿河镇), Liguan (李官镇), Xianyuwan (仙浴湾镇), Yuantai (元台镇), Wawo (瓦窝镇)

Townships:

- Zhaotun Township (赵屯乡), Tucheng Township, Liaoning (土城乡), Yandian Township (阎店乡), Xiyang Township (西杨乡), Tuoshan Township (驼山乡), Paoai Township (泡崖乡)

Ethnic Townships:

- Santai Manchu Ethnic Township (三台满族乡), Yangjia Manchu Township (杨家满族乡)

=== Zhuanghe ===
Subdistricts:

- Chengguan Subdistrict (城关街道), Xinhua Subdistrict (新华街道), Xingda Subdistrict (兴达街道), Changsheng Subdistrict (昌盛街道), Mingyang Subdistrict (明阳街道)

Towns:

- Qingdui (青堆镇), Xuling (徐岭镇), Heidao (黑岛镇), Lizifang (栗子房镇), Daying (大营镇), Taling (塔岭镇), Xianrendong (仙人洞镇), Ronghuashan (蓉花山镇), Changling (长岭镇), Hehuashan (荷花山镇), Chengshan (城山镇), Guangmingshan (光明山镇), Dazheng (大郑镇), Wulu (吴炉镇), Wangjia (王家镇)

Townships:

- Anzishan Township (鞍子山乡), Buyunshan Township (步云山乡), Landian Township (兰店乡), Shicheng Township (石城乡)

Ethnic Townships:

- Taipingling Manchu Ethnic Township (太平岭满族乡), Guiyunhua Manchu Ethnic Township (桂云花满族乡)

=== Changhai County ===
Towns:

- Dachangshandao (大长山岛镇), Zhangzidao (獐子岛镇), Guangludao (广鹿岛镇), Xiaochangshandao (小长山岛镇), Haiyangdao (海洋岛镇)

== Anshan ==
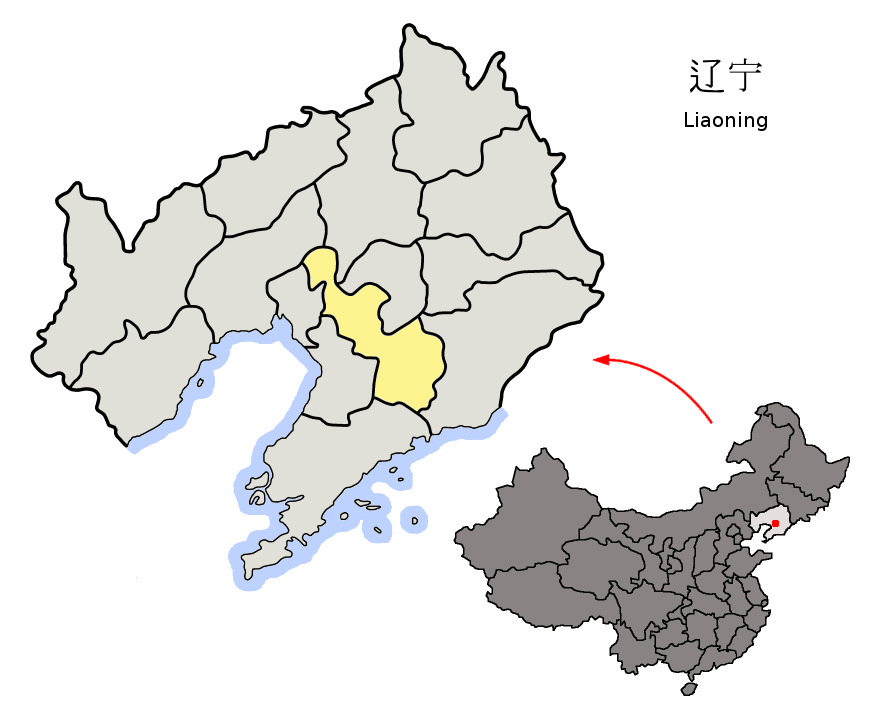
Location of Anshan in the province

=== Lishan District ===
Subdistricts:

- Lishan Subdistrict (立山街道), Youhao Subdistrict (友好街道), Shuangshan District (双山街道), Shuguang Subdistrict (曙光街道), Lingshan Subdistrict, Anshan (灵山街道), Shenbei Subdistrict (深北街道), Shennan Subdistrict (深南街道), Shahe Subdistrict (沙河街道)

Towns:

- Shahe (沙河镇), Qidashan (齐大山镇)

=== Qianshan District ===
Towns:

- Dong'anshan (东鞍山镇), Tangjiafang (唐家房镇), Ganquan (甘泉镇), Datun (大屯镇), Tanggangzi (汤岗子镇)

=== Tiedong District ===
Subdistricts:

- Dongchangdian Subdistrict (东长甸街道), Changdian Subdistrict (长甸街道), Hunan Subdistrict (湖南街道), Changqing Subdistrict (常青街道), Jiefang Subdistrict (解放街道), Shannan Subdistrict (山南街道), Yuanlin Subdistrict (园林街道), Shengli Subdistrict (胜利街道), Zhanqian Subdistrict Subdistrict (站前街道), Gangcheng Subdistrict (钢城街道), Heping Subdistrict (和平街道), Duilu Subdistrict (对炉街道)

=== Tiexi District, Anshan ===
Subdistricts:

- Yongle Subdistrict (永乐街道), Gonghe Subdistrict (共和街道), Xingsheng Subdistrict (兴盛街道), Bajiazi Subdistrict (八家子街道), Qiming Subdistrict (启明街道), Fanrong Subdistrict (繁荣街道), Xintao Subdistrict (新陶街道), Dalu Subdistrict (大陆街道), Beitaoguan Subdistrict (北陶官街道), Nanhua Subdistrict (南华街道), Yongfa Subdistrict (永发街道)

=== Haicheng ===
Subdistricts:

- Haizhou Subdistrict (海州街道), Xinghai Subdistrict (兴海街道), Xiangtang Subdistrict (响堂街道), Dongsi Subdistrict (东四街道)

Towns:

- Gushan (孤山镇), Chagou (岔沟镇), Jiewen (接文镇), Ximu (析木镇), Mafeng (马风镇), Pailou (牌楼镇), Yingluo (英落镇), Bali (八里镇), Maoqi (毛祁镇), Wangshi (王石镇), Nantai (南台镇), Xiliu (西柳镇), Ganwang (感王镇), Zhongxiao (中小镇), Niuzhuang (牛庄镇), Teng'ao (腾鳌镇), Gengzhuang (耿庄镇), Xisi (西四镇), Gaotuo (高坨镇), Wangtai (望台镇), Wenxiang (温香镇)

=== Tai'an County ===
Towns:

- Tai'an (台安镇), Gaolifang (高力房镇), Huangshatuo (黄沙坨镇), Xinkaihe (新开河镇), Sanglin (桑林镇), Jiucaitai (韭菜台镇), Xintai (新台镇), Fujia (富家镇), Huandong (桓洞镇), Xifo (西佛镇), Daniu (达牛镇)

=== Xiuyan Manchu Autonomous County ===
Towns:

- Xiuyan (岫岩镇), Pianling (偏岭镇), Suzigou (苏子沟镇), Huanghuadian (黄花甸镇), Sanjiazi (三家子镇), Shimiaozi (石庙子镇), Dayingzi (大营子镇), Yanghe (洋河镇), Xindian (新甸镇), Hadabei (哈达碑镇), Yangjiabao (杨家堡镇), Yanggou (汤沟镇), Qianyingzi (前营子镇), Longtan (龙潭镇), Shihuiyao (石灰窑镇), Muniu (牧牛镇), Yaoshan (药山镇), Dafangshen (大房身镇), Chaoyang (朝阳镇), Qingliangshan (清凉山镇)

Townships:

- Hongqiyingzi Township (红旗营子乡), Linggou Township (岭沟乡), Shaozihe Township (哨子河乡)

== Benxi ==
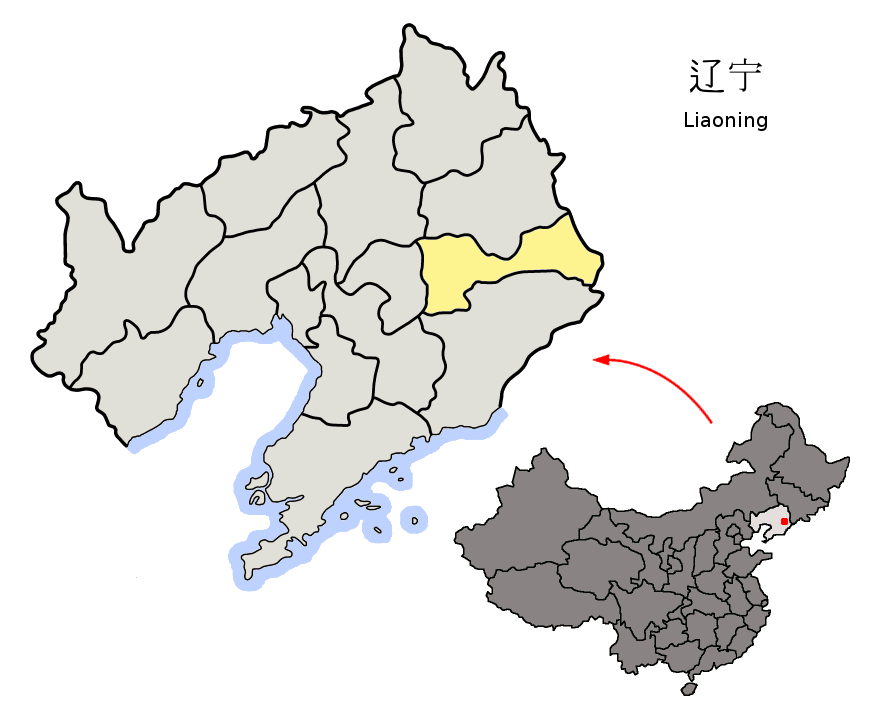
Location of Benxi in the province

=== Mingshan District ===
Subdistricts:

- Jinshan Subdistrict (金山街道), Dongxing Subdistrict (东兴街道), Xinming Subdistrict (新明街道), Gaoyu Subdistrict (高峪街道), Mingshan Subdistrict (明山街道), Niuxintai Subdistrict (牛心台街道), Beidi Subdistrict (北地街道)

Towns:

- Wolong (卧龙镇), Gaotaizi (高台子镇)

=== Nanfen District ===
Subdistricts:

- Tieshan Subdistrict (铁山街道), Nanfen Subdistrict (南芬街道)

The only town is Xiamatang (下马塘镇)

Townships:

- Nanfen Township (南芬乡), Sishanling Manchu Ethnic Township (思山岭满族乡)

=== Pingshan District ===
Subdistricts:

- Dongming Subdistrict (东明街道), Pingshan Subdistrict (平山街道), Cuidong Subdistrict (崔东街道), Zhanqian Subdistrict (站前街道), Gongren Subdistrict (工人街道), Qianjin Subdistrict (千金街道), Nandi Subdistrict (南地街道), Beitai Subdistrict (北台街道)

The only town is Qiaotou (桥头镇)

=== Xihu District ===
Subdistricts:

- Hedong Subdistrict (河东街道), Hexi Subdistrict (河西街道), Caitun Subdistrict (彩屯街道), Caibei Subdistrict (彩北街道), Shujing Subdistrict (竖井街道), Dongfeng Subdistrict (东风街道)

Towns:

- Huolianzhai (火连寨镇), Shiqiaozi (石桥子镇), Waitoushan (歪头山镇)

The only township is Zhangqizhai Township (张其寨乡)

=== Benxi Manchu Autonomous County ===
The only subdistrict is Guanyinge Subdistrict (观音阁街道)

Towns:

- Xiaoshi (小市镇), Tianshifu (田师傅镇), Caohekou (草河口镇), Lianshanguan (连山关镇), Qinghecheng (清河城镇), Nandian (南甸镇), Jianchang (碱厂镇), Caohecheng (草河城镇), Pianling (偏岭镇), Caohezhang (草河掌镇), Gaoguan (高官镇)

The only township is Dongyingfang Township (东营房乡)

=== Huanren Manchu Autonomous County ===
The only subdistrict is Bafengcheng Subdistrict (八卦城街道)

Towns:

- Huanren (桓仁镇), Pulebao (普乐堡镇), Erpengdianzi (二棚甸子镇), Shajianzi (沙尖子镇), Wulidianzi (五里甸子镇), Balidianzi (八里甸子镇), Hualai (华来镇), Gucheng (古城镇)

Townships:

- Yahe Korean Ethnic Township (雅河朝鲜族乡; Korean: 야하 조선족 향), Xiangyang Township (向阳乡), Heigou Township (黑沟乡), Beidianzi Township (北甸子乡)

== Chaoyang ==
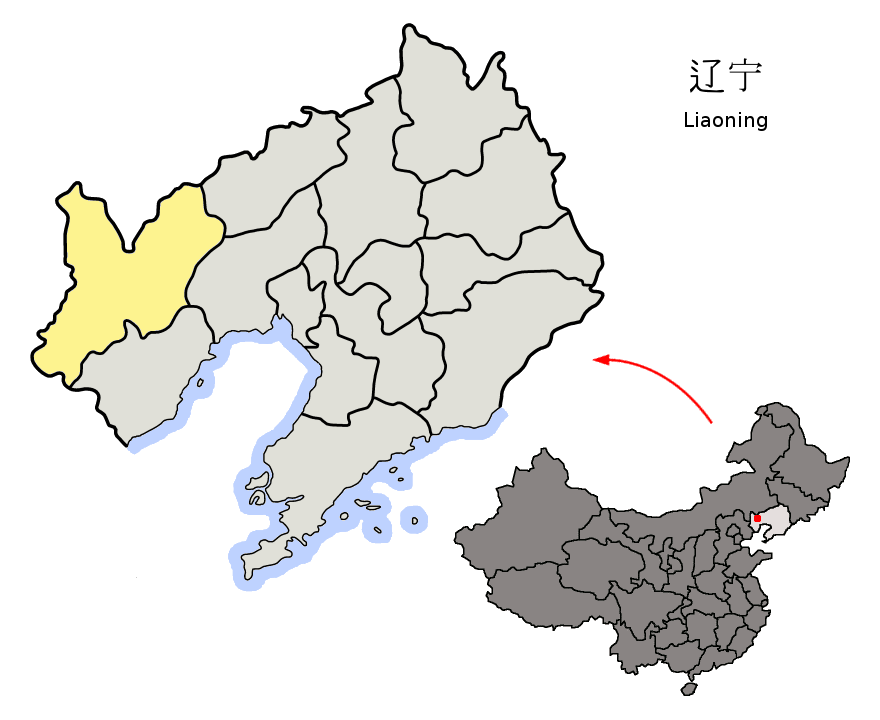
Location of Chaoyang in the province

=== Longcheng District ===
Subdistricts:

- Mashan Subdistrict (马山街道), Xiangyang Subdistrict (向阳街道), Xinhua Subdistrict (新华街道), Banlashan Subdistrict (半拉山街道)

Towns:

- Qidaoquanzi (七道泉子镇), Xidayingzi (西大营子镇), Zhaoduba (召都巴镇), Hedapingfang (和大平房镇)

Townships:

- Bianzhangzi Township (边杖子乡), Helianhe Township (和联合乡)

=== Shuangta District ===
Subdistricts:

- Nanta Subdistrict (南塔街道), Beita Subdistrict (北塔街道), Guangming Subdistrict (光明街道), Linghe Subdistrict (凌河街道), Qianjin Subdistrict Subdistrict (前进街道), Zhanqian Subdistrict (站前街道), Longshan Subdistrict (龙山街道), Yanbei Subdistrict (燕北街道), Hongqi Subdistrict (红旗街道), Lingfeng Subdistrict (凌凤街道)

Towns:

- Talagao (他拉皋镇), Taohuatu (桃花吐镇)

Townships:

- Changbaoyingzi Township (长宝营子乡), Sunjiawan Township (孙家湾乡)

=== Beipiao ===
Subdistricts:

- Nanshan Subdistrict (南山街道), Taiji Subdistrict (台吉街道), Sanbao Subdistrict (三宝街道), Qiaobei Subdistrict (桥北街道), Chengguan Subdistrict (城关街道), Guanshan Subdistrict (冠山街道), Dongtaiji Subdistrict (东台吉街道)

Towns:

- Baoguolao (宝国老镇), Heichengzi (黑城子镇), Xiguanying (西官营镇), Shangyuan (上园镇), Wujianfang (五间房镇), Daban (大板镇)

Townships:

- Dongguanying Township (东官营乡), Sanbao Township (三宝乡), Quanjuyong Township (泉巨永乡), Sanbaoying Township (三宝营乡), Beitazi Township (北塔子乡), Taijiying Township (台吉营乡), Loujiadian Township (娄家店乡), Beisijia Township (北四家乡), Changheying Township (常河营乡), Xiaotazi Township (小塔子乡), Dasanjiazi Township (大三家子乡), Mengguying Township (蒙古营乡), Longtan Township (龙潭乡), Changgao Township (长皋乡), Batuying Township (巴图营乡), Ha'ernao Township (哈尔脑乡), Zhangguying Township (章吉营乡), Liangshuihe Mongol Ethnic Township (凉水河蒙古族乡), Mayouying Manchu Ethnic Township (马友营蒙古族乡)

=== Lingyuan ===
Subdistricts:

- Nanjie Subdistrict (南街街道), Beijie Subdistrict (北街街道), Chengguanzhen Subdistrict (城关镇街道), Xingyuan Subdistrict (兴源街道), Dongcheng Subdistrict (东城街道), Lingbei Subdistrict (凌北街道), Hongshan Subdistrict (红山街道), Reshuitang Subdistrict (热水汤街道)

Towns:

- Wanyuandian (万元店镇), Songzhangzi (宋杖子镇), Sanshijiazi (三十家子镇), Yangzhangzi (杨杖子镇), Dao'erdeng (刀尔登镇), Songlingzi (松岭子镇), Siguanyingzi (四官营子镇), Goumenzi (沟门子镇), Xiaochengzi (小城子镇), Sihedang (四合当镇), Wulanbai (乌兰白镇)

Townships:

- Liuzhangzi Township (刘杖子乡), Sandaohezi Township (三道河子乡), Niuyingzi Township (牛营子乡), Beilu Township (北炉乡), Hekanzi Township (河坎子乡), Dawangzhangzi Township (大王杖子乡), Foyedong Township (佛爷洞乡), Wafangdian Township (瓦房店乡), Dahebei Township (大河北乡), Qianjin Township (前进乡), Sanjiazi Mongol Ethnic Township (三家子蒙古族乡)

=== Chaoyang County ===
Towns:

- Liucheng (柳城镇), Damiao (大庙镇), Wafangzi (瓦房子镇), Liujiazi (六家子镇), Dapingfang (大平房镇), Boluochi (波罗赤镇), Mutouchengzi (木头城子镇), Ershijiazi (二十家子镇), Yangshan (羊山镇)

Townships:

- Lianhe Township (联合乡), Dongdatun Township (东大屯乡), Qidaoling Township (七道岭乡), Beigoumen Township (北沟门乡), Beisijiazi Township (北四家子乡), Wulanhe Township (乌兰河硕乡), Dongdadao Township (东大道乡), Heiniu Township (黑牛乡), Gende Township (根德乡), Wangyingzi Township (王营子乡), Shangzhi Township (尚志乡), Nanshuangmiao Township (南双庙乡), Songlingmen Township (松岭门乡), Gushanzi Township (古山子乡), Shengli Township (胜利乡), Taizi Township (台子乡)

=== Harqin Left Wing Mongol Autonomous County ===
Towns:

- Dachengzi (大城子镇), Zhongsanjia (中三家镇), Gongyingzi (公营子镇), Liuguanyingzi (六官营子镇), Nanshao (南哨镇), Laoyemiao (老爷庙镇), Nangongyingzi (南公营子镇), Pingfangzi (平房子镇), Shanjuzi (山咀子镇), Baitazi (白塔子镇), Shanzuizi (山嘴子镇)

Townships:

- Wohugou Township (卧虎沟乡), Ganzhao Township (甘招乡), Shuiquan Township (水泉乡), Xinglongzhuang Township (兴隆庄乡), Dayingzi Township (大营子乡), Kunduyingzi Township (坤都营子乡), Yangjiaogou Township (羊角沟乡), Youzhangzi Township (尤杖子乡), Shi'erdebao Township (十二德堡乡), Caochang Township (草场乡), Dongshao Township (东哨乡)

=== Jianping County ===
Towns:

- Tubaishou (叶柏寿镇), Zhulike (朱力科镇), Jianping (建平镇), Heishui (黑水镇), Kalaqin (喀喇沁镇), Shahai (沙海镇), Wanshou (万寿镇), Haladaokou (哈拉道口镇), Reshui (热水镇), Laoguandi (老官地镇), Bei'ershijiazi Hui Town (北二十家子回族镇)

Townships:

- Fushan Township (富山乡), Shenjing Township (深井乡), Yushulinzi Township (榆树林子乡), Gushanzi Township (孤山子乡), Qingsongling Township (青松岭乡), Yangcunling Township (杨树岭乡), Huizhou Township (惠州乡), Machang Township (马场乡), Luofugou Township (罗福沟乡), Shaoguoyingzi Township (烧锅营子乡), Xiangyang Township (向阳乡), Taipingzhuang Township (太平庄乡), Baishan Township (白山乡), Kuidesuo Township (奎德素乡), Zhangjiayingzi Township (张家营子乡), Xiaotang Township (小塘乡), Baijiawa Township (白家洼乡), Yichenggong Township (义成功乡), Qingfengshan Township (青峰山乡), Bajia Township (八家乡), Sanjia Mongol Ethnic Township (三家蒙古族乡)

== Dandong ==
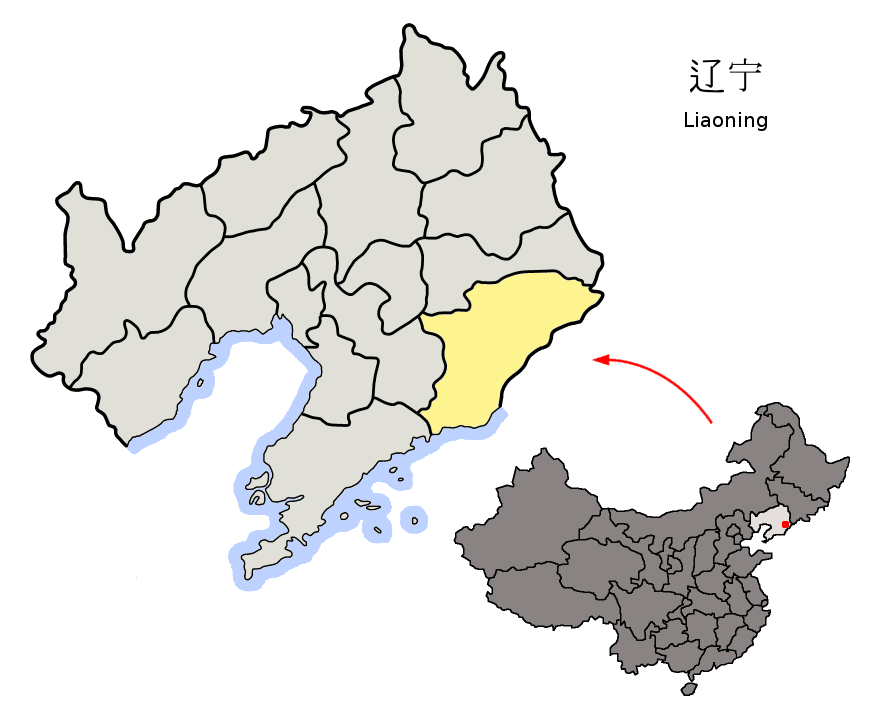
Location of Dandong in the province

=== Yuanbao District ===
Subdistricts:

- Liudaokou Subdistrict (六道口街道), Qidao Subdistrict (七道街道), Badao Subdistrict (八道街道), Jiudao Subdistrict (九道街道), Guangji Subdistrict (广济街道), Xingdong Subdistrict (兴东街道)

The only town is Jinshan (金山镇)

=== Zhen'an District ===
Subdistricts:

- Yalu River Subdistrict (鸭绿江街道), Zhenzhu Subdistrict (珍珠街道), Taiping Bay Subdistrict (太平湾街道), Jinkuang Subdistrict (金矿街道)

Towns:

- Wulongbei (五龙背镇), Loufang (楼房镇), Tangshancheng (汤山城镇), Tongxing (同兴镇), Jiuliancheng (九连城镇)

=== Zhenxing District ===
Subdistricts:

- Yongchang Subdistrict (永昌街道), Liudaogou Subdistrict (六道沟街道), Toudao Bridge Subdistrict (头道桥街道), Xianwei Subdistrict (纤维街道), Linjiang Subdistrict (临江街道), Huayuan Subdistrict (花园街道), Zhanqian Subdistrict (站前街道), Maokuishan Subdistrict (帽盔山街道), Xicheng Subdistrict (西城街道)

The only town is Tangchi (汤池镇)

=== Fengcheng ===
Subdistricts:

- Fenghuangcheng Subdistrict (凤凰城街道), Fengshan Subdistrict (凤山街道), Caohe Subdistrict (草河街道)

Towns:

- Qingchengzi (青城子镇), Tongyuanbao (通远堡镇), Aiyang (爱阳镇), Saima (赛马镇), Jiguanshan (鸡冠山镇), Bianmen (边门镇), Hongqi (红旗镇), Dixiongshan (弟兄山镇), Dongtang (东汤镇), Liujiahe (刘家河镇), Baoshan (宝山镇), Lanqi (蓝旗镇), Baiqi (白旗镇), Simenzi (四门子镇), Shicheng (石城镇), Shalizhai (沙里寨镇), Daxing (大兴镇)

The only township is Dabao Mongol Ethnic Township (大堡蒙古族乡)

=== Donggang ===
Subdistricts:

- Dadong Subdistrict (大东街道), Xincheng Subdistrict (新城街道), Xinxing Subdistrict (新兴街道)

Towns:

- Gushan (孤山镇), Qianyang (前阳镇), Changshan (长山镇), Beijingzi (北井子镇), Yiquan (椅圈镇), Huangtukan (黄土坎镇), Majiadian (马家店镇), Pusamiao (菩萨庙镇), Longwangmiao (龙王庙镇), Xiaodianzi (小甸子镇), Chang'an (长安镇), Xinnong (新农镇), Heigou (黑沟镇), Shizijie (十字街镇)

The only township is Helong Manchu Ethnic Township (合隆满族乡)

=== Kuandian Manchu Autonomous County ===
Towns:

- Kuandian (宽甸镇), Guanshui (灌水镇), Taipingshao (太平哨镇), Yongdian (永甸镇), Changdian (长甸镇), Maodianzi (毛甸子镇), Qingshangou (青山沟镇), Hongshi (红石镇), Niumaowu (牛毛坞镇), Dachuantou (大川头镇), Bahechuan (八河川镇), Shuangshanzi (双山子镇), Daxicha (大西岔镇), Budayuan (步达远镇), Zhenjiang (振江镇), Qingyishan (青椅山镇), Yangmuchuan (杨木川镇), Hushan (虎山镇), Penghai (硼海镇)

Townships:

- Gulouzi Township (古楼子乡), Shihugou Township (石湖沟乡), Xialuhe Korean Ethnic Township (下露河朝鲜族乡; Korean: 하로하 조선족 향)

== Fushun ==
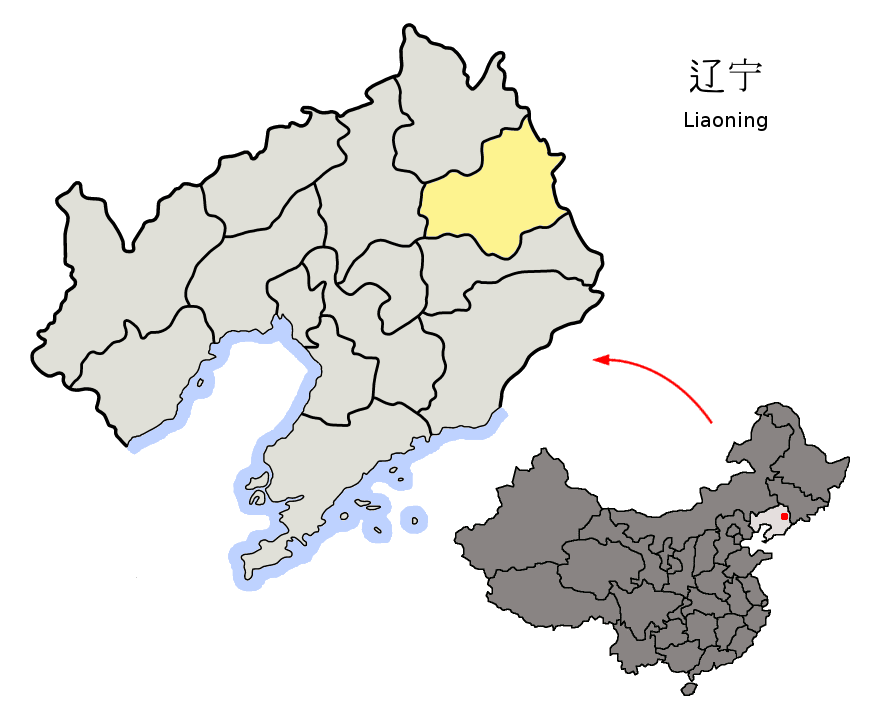
Location of Fushun in the province

=== Dongzhou District ===
Subdistricts:

- Dongzhou Subdistrict (东洲街道), Xintun Subdistrict (新屯街道), Zhangdian Subdistrict (张甸街道), Dalian Subdistrict (搭连街道), Longfeng Subdistrict (龙凤街道), Wanxin Subdistrict (万新街道), Laohutai Subdistrict (老虎台街道), Pingshan Subdistrict (平山街道), Nanhuayuan Subdistrict (南花园街道), Liushan Subdistrict (刘山街道)

Townships:

- Nianpan Township (碾盘乡), Qianjin Township (千金乡)

=== Shuncheng District ===
Subdistricts:

- Changchun Subdistrict (长春街道), Hedong Subdistrict (河东街道), Xinhua Subdistrict (新华街道), Fushuncheng Subdistrict (抚顺城街道), Jiangjunbao Subdistrict (将军堡街道), Gebu Subdistrict (葛布街道)

The only town is Qiandian (前甸镇)

Townships:

- Hebei Township (河北乡), Huiyuan Township (会元乡)

=== Wanghua District ===
Subdistricts:

- Jianshe Subdistrict (建设街道), Wulaotun Subdistrict (五老屯街道), Guchengzi Subdistrict (古城子街道), Binwu Subdistrict (演武街道), Putun Subdistrict (朴屯街道), Guangming Subdistrict (光明街道), Heping Subdistrict (和平街道), Gongnong Subdistrict (工农街道), Tiantun Subdistrict (田屯街道), Xinmin Subdistrict (新民街道)

The only town is Tayu (town) (塔峪镇)

=== Xinfu District ===
Subdistricts:

- Zhanqian Subdistrict (站前街道), Fumin Subdistrict (福民街道), Xinfu Subdistrict (新抚街道), Yong'antai Subdistrict (永安台街道), East Park Subdistrict (东公园街道), Yulin Subdistrict (榆林街道)

=== Fushun County ===
Towns:

- Zhangdang (章党镇), Shiwen (石文镇), Hou'an (后安镇), Hada (哈达镇)

Townships:

- Xiahe Township (峡河乡), Jiubing Township (救兵乡), Hailang Township (海浪乡), Maquanzi Township (马圈子乡), Shangma Township (上马乡), Lanshan Township (兰山乡), Lagu Manchu Ethnic Township (拉古满族乡), Tangtu Manchu Ethnic Township (汤图满族乡)

=== Qingyuan Manchu Autonomous County ===
Towns:

- Qingyuan (清原镇), Dagujia (大孤家镇), Hongtoushan (红透山镇), Ying'emen (英额门镇), Nanshancheng (南山城镇), Nankouqian (南口前镇), Caoshi (草市镇), Xiajiabao (夏家堡镇), Wandianzi (湾甸子镇)

Townships:

- Tukouzi Township (土口子乡), Beisanjia Township (北三家乡), Aojiabao Township (敖家堡乡), Dasuhe Township (大苏河乡), Gounai Township (枸乃甸乡)

=== Xinbin Manchu Autonomous County ===
Towns:

- Xinbin (新宾镇), Xiayingzi (下营子镇), Dasiping (大四平镇), Shangjiahe (上夹河镇), Muqi (木奇镇), Pingdingshan (平顶山镇), Yongling (永陵镇), Weiziyu (苇子峪镇), Nanzamu (南杂木镇), Wangqingmen (旺清门镇)

Townships:

- Xiajiahe Township (下夹河乡), Besisiping Township (北四平乡), Hongsheng Township (红升乡), Hongmiaozi Township (红庙子乡), Tangtu Township (汤图乡), Chengjiao Township (城郊乡), Xiangshuihezi Township (响水河子乡), Xiayuan Township (夏园乡), Yushu Township (榆树乡), Jiahe Township (嘉禾乡)

== Fuxin ==
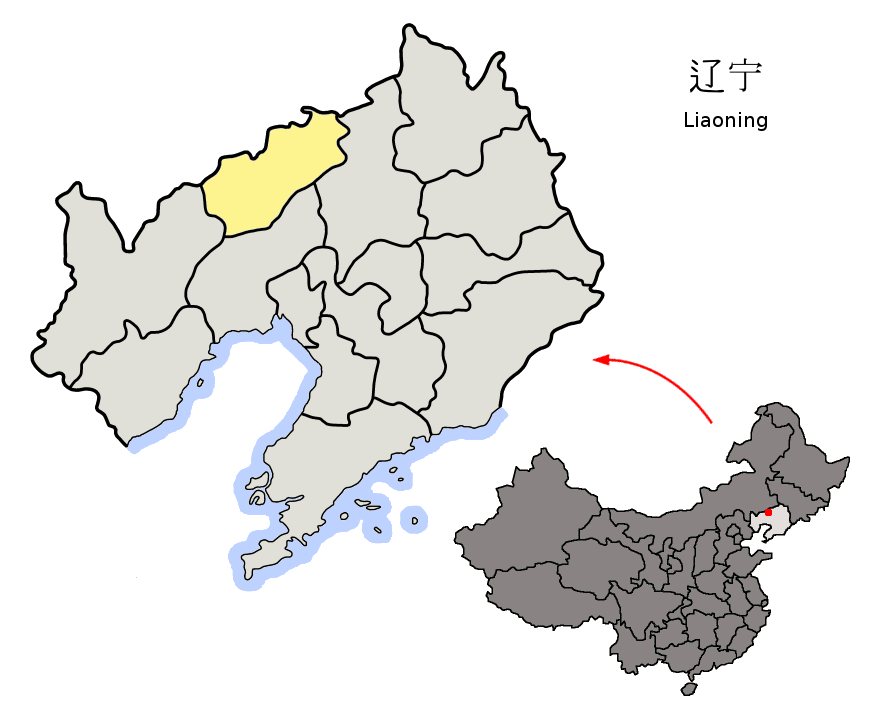
Location of Fuxin in the province

=== Haizhou District ===
Subdistricts:

- Heping Subdistrict (和平街道), Xinxing Subdistrict (新兴街道), Xishan Subdistrict (西山街道), Hebei Subdistrict (河北街道), Zhanqian Subdistrict (站前街道), West Fuxin Subdistrict (西阜新街道), Wulong Subdistrict (五龙街道), Gongrencun Subdistrict (工人村街道)

The only town is Hanjiadian (韩家店镇)

=== Qinghemen District ===
Subdistricts:

- Xinbei Subdistrict (新北街道), Liutai Subdistrict (六台街道), Aiyou Subdistrict (艾友街道), Qinghe Subdistrict (清河街道)

Towns:

- Wulongba (乌龙坝镇), Hexi (河西镇)

=== Taiping District ===
Subdistricts:

- Hongshu Subdistrict (红树街道), Meihai Subdistrict (煤海街道), Gaode Subdistrict (高德街道), Chengnan Subdistrict (城南街道), Sunjiawan Subdistrict (孙家湾街道)

The only town is Shuiquan (水泉镇)

=== Xihe District ===
Subdistricts:

- Xiyuan Subdistrict (西苑街道), Beiyuan Subdistrict (北苑街道), Dongyuan Subdistrict (东苑街道), Xueyuan Subdistrict (学苑街道), Huadong Subdistrict (华东街道), Zhongyuan Subdistrict (中苑街道)

The only town is Sihe (四合镇)

=== Xinqiu District ===
Subdistricts:

- Jieji Subdistrict (街基街道), Beibu Subdistrict (北部街道), Zhongbu Subdistrict (中部街道), Nanbu Subdistrict (南部街道), Xinglong Subdistrict (兴隆街道)

The only town is Changyingzi (长营子镇)

=== Fuxin Mongol Autonomous County ===
Towns:

- Shijiazi (十家子镇), Yusi (于寺镇), Daba (大巴镇), Wangfu (王府镇), Dongliang (东梁镇), Jiumiao (旧庙镇), Wuhuanchi (务欢池镇), Tabenzhalan (他本扎兰镇), Yimatu (伊玛图镇), Fosi (佛寺镇), Paozi (泡子镇), Jianshe (建设镇), Furong (富荣镇)

Townships:

- Qijiazi Township (七家子乡), Bajiazi Township (八家子乡), Shiwujiazi Township (大五家子乡), Daban Township (大板乡), Daguben Township (大固本乡), Taiping Township (太平乡), Zhalanyingzi Township (扎兰营子乡), Huashige Township (化石戈乡), Ping'andi Township (平安地乡), Laohetu Township (老河土乡), Hongmaozi Township (红帽子乡), Cangtu Township (苍土乡), Shala Township (沙拉乡), Zhaoshugou Township (招束沟乡), Guohua Township (国华乡), Wofenggou Township (卧凤沟乡), Hadahushao Township (哈达户稍乡), Zidutai Township (紫都台乡), Tayingzi Township (塔营子乡), Xinmin Township (新民乡), Fuxingdi Township (福兴地乡), Zhizhushan Township (蜘蛛山乡)

=== Zhangwu County ===
Towns:

- Zhangwu (彰武镇), Ha'ertao (哈尔套镇), Zhanggutai (章古台镇), Dongliujiazi (东六家子镇), Wufeng (五峰镇), Fengjia (冯家镇), Houxinqiu (后新秋镇), A'erxiang (阿尔乡镇)

Townships:

- Liangjiazi Township (两家子乡), Shuangmiao Township (双庙乡), Ping'an Township (平安乡), Mantanghong Township (满堂红乡), Sibaozi Township (四堡子乡), Fengtian Township (丰田乡), Qianfuxingdi Township (前福兴地乡), Xinglongbao Township (兴隆堡乡), Xinglongshan Township (兴隆山乡), Dasijiazi Township (大四家子乡), Sihecheng Township (四合城乡), Dade Township (大德乡), Weizigou Mongol Ethnic Township (苇子沟蒙古族乡), Erdaohezi Mongol Ethnic Township (二道河子蒙古族乡), Xiliujiazi Mongol and Manchu Ethnic Township (西六家子蒙古族满族乡), Daleng Mongol Ethnic Township (大冷蒙古族乡)

== Huludao ==
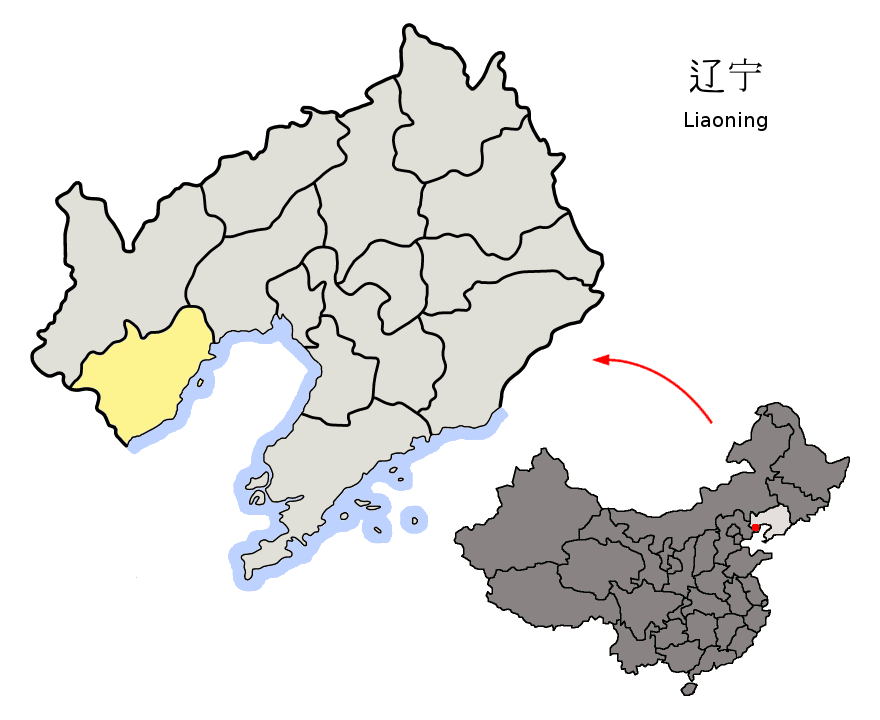
Location of Huludao in the province

=== Lianshan District ===
Subdistricts:

- Xinggong Subdistrict (兴工街道), Bohai Subdistrict (渤海街道), Huaji Subdistrict (化机街道), Lianshan Subdistrict (连山街道), Shuini Subdistrict (水泥街道), Zhanqian Subdistrict (站前街道), Huagong Subdistrict (化工街道), Shiyou Subdistrict (石油街道), Jinjiao Subdistrict (锦郊街道), Yangjiazhangzi Economic and Technological Development Zone (杨家杖子经济技术开发区)

Towns:

- Taijitun (台集屯镇), Si'erbao (寺儿堡镇), Jinxing (金星镇), Gangtun (钢屯镇), Hongluoxian (虹螺蚬镇), Gaoqiao (高桥镇), Xintaimen Mongol Town (新台门蒙古族镇)

Townships:

- Shanshenmiaozi Township (山神庙子乡), Baimashi Township (白马石乡), Shaheying Township (沙河营乡), Guzhuyingzi Township (孤竹营子乡), Yangjiao Township (杨郊乡), Zhangxianggongtun Township (张相公屯乡), Tashan Township (塔山乡), Daxing Township (大兴乡)

=== Longgang District ===
Subdistricts:

- Shuanglong Subdistrict (双龙街道), East Subdistrict (东街道), West Subdistrict (西街道), Binhai Subdistrict (滨海街道), Wanghaisi Subdistrict (望海寺街道), Huludao Subdistrict (葫芦岛街道), Longwan Subdistrict (龙湾街道), Beigang Subdistrict (北港街道), Lianwan Subdistrict (连湾街道), Yuhuang Subdistrict (玉皇街道)

=== Nanpiao District ===
Subdistricts:

- Jiulong Subdistrict, Jiulong Subdistrict (九龙街道), Qiupigou Subdistrict (邱皮沟街道), Xiaolinghe Subdistrict (小凌河街道), Zhaojiatun Subdistrict (赵家屯街道), Weizigou Subdistrict (苇子沟街道), Shaguotun Subdistrict (沙锅屯街道), Sanjiazi Subdistrict (三家子街道)

Towns:

- Nuanchitang (暖池塘镇), Gangyaoling (缸窑岭镇)

Townships:

- Shaguotun Township (沙锅屯乡), Huangtukan Township (黄土坎乡)

=== Xingcheng ===
Subdistricts:

- Gucheng Subdistrict (古城街道), Ningyuan Subdistrict (宁远街道), Diaoyutai Subdistrict (钓鱼台街道), Chengdong Subdistrict (城东街道), Wenquan Subdistrict (温泉街道), Sijiatun Subdistrict (四家屯街道), Huashan Subdistrict (华山街道)

Towns:

- Dongxinzhuang (东辛庄镇), Shahousuo (沙后所镇), Guojia (郭家镇), Caozhuang (曹庄镇)

Townships:

- Shuangshu Township (双树乡), Juhuadao Township (菊花岛乡), Dazhai Manchu Ethnic Township (大寨满族乡), Sandaogou Manchu Ethnic Township (三道沟满族乡), Yuantaizi Manchu Ethnic Township (元台子满族乡), Baita Manchu Ethnic Township (白塔满族乡), Jiumen Manchu Ethnic Township (旧门满族乡), Yang'an Manchu Ethnic Township (羊安满族乡), Liutaizi Manchu Ethnic Township (刘台子满族乡), Hongyazi Manchu Ethnic Township (红崖子满族乡), Nandashan Manchu Ethnic Township (南大山满族乡), Yaowang Manchu Ethnic Township (药王满族乡), Gaojialing Manchu Ethnic Township (高家岭满族乡), Haibin Manchu Ethnic Township (海滨满族乡), Wanghai Manchu Ethnic Township (望海满族乡), Jianchang Manchu Ethnic Township (碱厂满族乡), Weizhan Manchu Ethnic Township (围屏满族乡)

=== Jianchang County ===
Towns:

- Jianchang (建昌镇), Bajiazi (八家子镇), Lamadong (喇嘛洞镇), Yaowangmiao (药王庙镇), Tangshenmiao (汤神庙镇), Linglongta (玲珑塔镇), Datun (大屯镇)

Townships:

- Maoniuyingzi Township (牦牛营子乡), Yaolugou Township (要路沟乡), Shifo Township (石佛乡), Suozhuyingzi Township (素珠营子乡), Xijianchang Township (西碱厂乡), Shihuiyaozi Township (石灰窑子乡), Wangbaoyingzi Township (王宝营子乡), Weijialing Township (魏家岭乡), Laodazhangzi Township (老大杖子乡), Toudaoyingzi Township (头道营子乡), Xinkailing Township (新开岭乡), Hezhangzi Township (贺杖子乡), Yangmadianzi Township (养马甸子乡), Heshangfangzi Township (和尚房子乡), Yangshuwanzi Township (杨树湾子乡), Heishanke Township (黑山科乡), Leijiadian Township (雷家店乡), Bashihan Township (巴什罕乡), Xiaodeyingzi Township (小德营子乡), Niangniangmiao Township (娘娘庙乡), Guzhangzi Township (谷杖子乡), Erdaowanzi Mongol Ethnic Township (二道弯子蒙古族乡)

=== Suizhong County ===
Towns:

- Suizhong (绥中镇), Qianwei (前卫镇), Wanjia (万家镇), Qiansuo (前所镇), Gaoling (高岭镇), Tashantun (塔山屯镇), Xidianzi (西甸子镇), Wangbao (王宝镇), Huangdi (荒地镇), Kuanbang (宽邦镇), Dawangmiao (大王庙镇), Xiaozhuangzi (小庄子镇), Gaotai (高台镇), Shahe (沙河镇)

Townships:

- Qiuzigou Township (秋子沟乡), Jiabeiyan Township (加碑岩乡), Yong'anbao Township (永安堡乡), Lijiabao Township (李家堡乡), Chengjiao Township (城郊乡), Xipingpo Manchu Ethnic Township (西平坡满族乡), Gejia Manchu Ethnic Township (葛家满族乡), Gaodianzi Manchu Ethnic Township (高甸子满族乡), Fanjia Manchu Ethnic Township (范家满族乡), Wanghu Manchu Ethnic Township (网户满族乡), Mingshui Manchu Ethnic Township (明水满族乡)

== Jinzhou ==
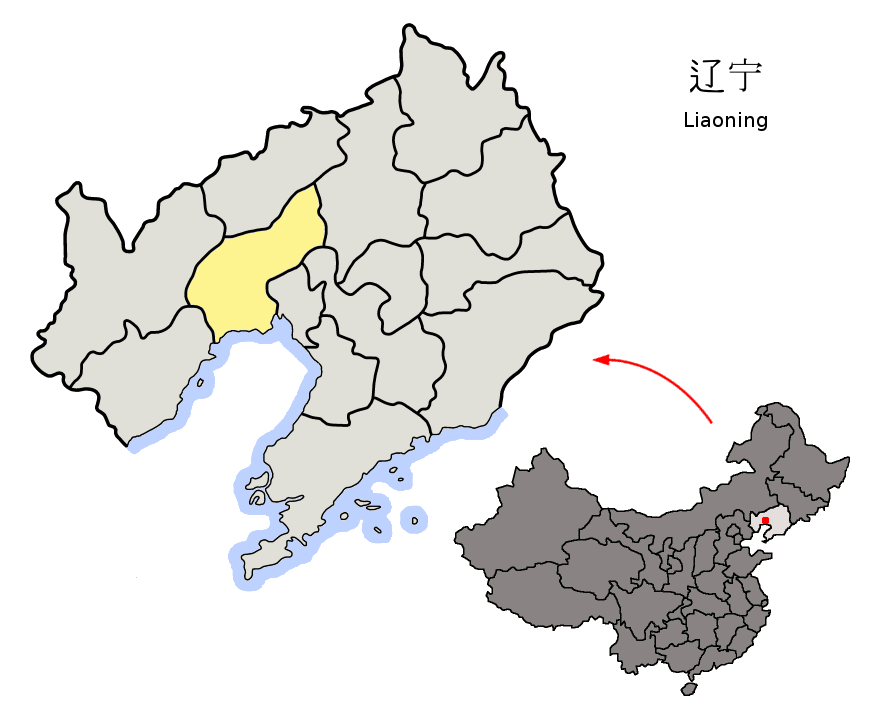
Location of Jinzhou in the province

=== Guta District ===
Subdistricts:

- Tian'an Subdistrict (天安街道), Shiyou Subdistrict (石油街道), Beijie Subdistrict (北街街道), Bao'an Subdistrict (保安街道), Raoyang Subdistrict (饶阳街道), Nanjie Subdistrict (南街街道), Zhanqian Subdistrict (站前街道), Jingye Subdistrict (敬业街道), Shiying Subdistrict (士英街道)

=== Linghe District ===
Subdistricts:

- Zhengda Subdistrict (正大街道), Longjiang Subdistrict (龙江街道), Majia Subdistrict (马家街道), Baigu Subdistrict (百股街道), Tiexin Subdistrict (铁新街道), Kangning Subdistrict (康宁街道), Ling'an Subdistrict (凌安街道), Juyuan Subdistrict (菊园街道), Jintie Subdistrict (锦铁街道), Liuhua Subdistrict (榴花街道), Shiqiaozi Subdistrict (石桥子街道)

=== Taihe District ===
Subdistricts:

- Taihe Subdistrict (太和街道), Xinglong Subdistrict (兴隆街道), Tanghezi Subdistrict (汤和子街道), Lingxi Subdistrict (凌西街道), Daxue Subdistrict (大薛街道), Wangjia Subdistrict (王家街道), Tianqiao Subdistrict (天桥街道), Xingshan Subdistrict (杏山街道), Lingnan Subdistrict (凌南街道)

Towns:

- Niangnianggong (娘娘宫镇), Songshan (松山镇)

Townships:

- Nü'erhe Township (女儿河乡), Yingpan Township (营盘乡), Xinmin Township (新民乡)

=== Beizhen ===
Subdistricts:

- Beizhen Subdistrict (北镇街道), Guanyinge Subdistrict (观音阁街道)

Towns:

- Dashi (大市镇), Zheng'an (正安镇), Zhong'an (中安镇), Luoluobao (罗罗堡镇), Changxingdian (常兴店镇), Lüyang (闾阳镇), Goubangzi (沟帮子镇), Liaotun (廖屯镇), Qingduizi (青堆子镇), Gaoshanzi (高山子镇), Zhaotun (赵屯镇)

Townships:

- Futun Township (富屯乡), Baojia Township (鲍家乡), Datun Township (大屯乡), Liujia Township (柳家乡), Wujia Township (吴家乡), Guangning Township (广宁乡)

=== Linghai ===
Subdistricts:

- Daling River Subdistrict (大凌河街道), Jincheng Subdistrict (金城街道)

Towns:

- Shishan (石山镇), Yuji (余积镇), Shuangyang (双羊镇), Banjita (班吉塔镇), Shenjiatai (沈家台镇), Santaizi (三台子镇), Youwei Manchu Town (右卫满族镇), Yanjia (闫家镇), Xinzhuangzi (新庄子镇), Niangniangguan (娘娘宫镇), Cuiyan (翠岩镇)

Townships:

- Daye Township (大业乡), Xibaqian Township (西八千乡), Jianye Township (建业乡), Wendilou Manchu Ethnic Township (温滴楼满族乡), Baitaizi Township (白台子乡), Xietun Township (谢屯乡), Antun Township (安屯乡), Banshigou Township (板石沟乡)

=== Heishan County ===
Towns:

- Heishan (黑山镇), Xinlitun (新立屯镇), Badaohao (八道壕镇), Xiaodong (小东镇), Dahushan (大虎山镇), Wuliangdian (无梁殿镇), Baichangmen (白厂门镇), Banlamen (半拉门镇), Sijiazi (四家子镇), Fangshan (芳山镇), Lijia (励家镇), Hujia (胡家镇), Jiangtun (姜屯镇), Raoyanghe (绕阳河镇), Changxing (常兴镇), Xinxing (新兴镇), Taihe (太和镇)

Townships:

- Daxing Township (大兴乡), Yingchengzi Township (英城子乡), Duanjia Township (段家乡), Xuetun Township (薛屯乡), Zhen'an Township (镇安乡)

=== Yi County ===
Towns:

- Yizhou (义州镇), Qilihe (七里河镇), Jiudaoling (九道岭镇), Dayushubao (大榆树堡镇), Liulongtai (刘龙台镇), Gaotaizi (高台子镇), Shaohuyingzi (稍户营子镇)

Townships:

- Baimiaozi Township (白庙子乡), Toutai Manchu Ethnic Township (头台满族乡), Zhangjiabao Township (张家堡乡), Qianyang Township (前杨乡), Dadingbao Manchu Ethnic Township (大定堡满族乡), Waziyu Manchu Ethnic Township (瓦子峪满族乡), Toudaohe Manchu Ethnic Township (头道河满族乡), Dicangsi Manchu Ethnic Township (地藏寺满族乡), Chengguan Manchu Ethnic Township (城关满族乡), Liulonggou Manchu Ethnic Township (留龙沟满族乡), Juliangtun Manchu Ethnic Township (聚粮屯满族乡)

== Liaoyang ==
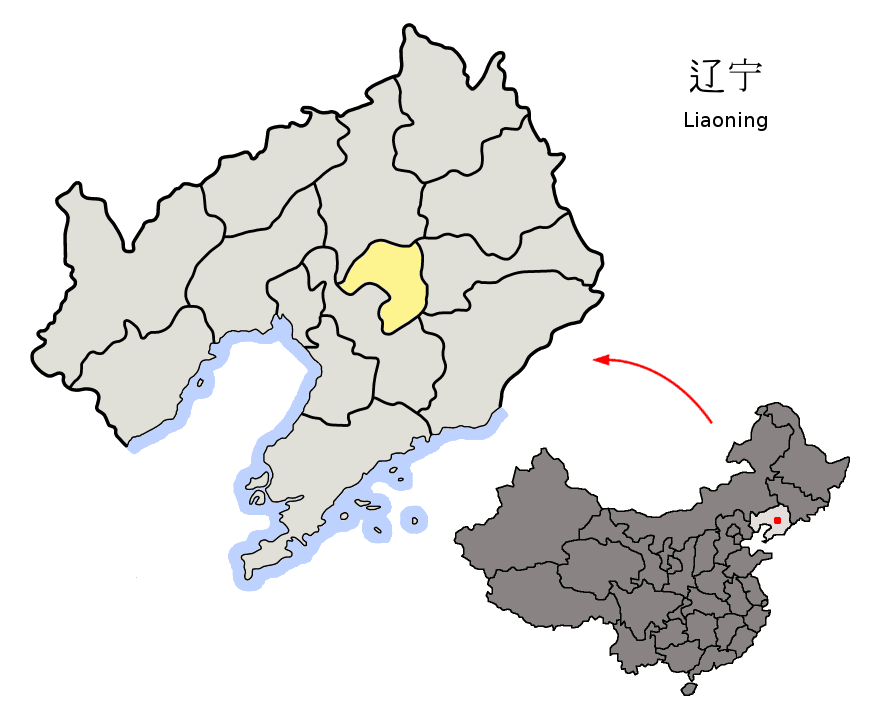
Location of Liaoyang in the province

=== Baita District ===
Subdistricts:

- Xuwangzi Subdistrict (徐往子街道), Baitangfang Subdistrict (白趟房街道), Weiguo Road Subdistrict (卫国路街道), Xinghuo Subdistrict (星火街道), Zhanqian Subdistrict (站前街道), Wayaozi Subdistrict (瓦窑子街道), Shengli Subdistrict (胜利街道), Yuejin Subdistrict (跃进街道)

=== Gongchangling District ===
Subdistricts:

- Tuanshanzi Subdistrict (团山子街道), Anping Subdistrict (安平街道), Sujia Subdistrict (苏家街道)

The only town is Tanghe (汤河镇)

The only township is Anping Township (安平乡)

=== Hongwei District ===
Subdistricts:

- Changzheng Subdistrict (长征街道), Xincun Subdistrict (新村街道), Gongnong Subdistrict (工农街道), Guanghua Subdistrict (光华街道)

The only town is Shuguang (曙光镇)

=== Taizihe District ===
Subdistricts:

- Wangshuitai Subdistrict (望水台街道), Xinhua Subdistrict (新华街道)

The only town is Qijia (祁家镇)

Townships:

- Dongningwei Township (东宁卫乡), Dongjingling Township (东京陵乡)

=== Wensheng District ===
Subdistricts:

- Wensheng Subdistrict (文圣街道), Wusheng Subdistrict (武圣街道), Xiangping Subdistrict (襄平街道), Nanmen Subdistrict (南门街道), Dongxing Subdistrict (东兴街道), Qingyang Subdistrict (庆阳街道)

=== Dengta ===
Subdistricts:

- Wanbaoqiao Subdistrict (万宝桥街道), Yantai Subdistrict (烟台街道), Gucheng Subdistrict (古城街道)

Towns:

- Dengta Town (灯塔镇), Huazi (铧子镇), Zhangtaizi (张台子镇), Xidayao (西大窑镇), Tong'erbao (佟二堡镇), Shendanbao (沈旦堡镇), Liutiaozhai (柳条寨镇), Ximafeng (西马峰镇), Wangjia (王家镇), Liuhezi (柳河子镇), Luodatai (罗大台镇), Dahenan (大河南镇)

The only township is Jiguanshan Township (鸡冠山乡)

=== Liaoyang County ===
Towns:

- Shoushan (首山镇), Mujia (穆家镇), Lanjia (兰家镇), Liuhao (柳壕镇), Bahui (八会镇), Tangmazhai (唐马寨镇), Hanling (寒岭镇), Helan (河栏镇), Xiaobeihe (小北河镇), Liu'erbao (刘二堡镇), Huangniwa (黄泥洼镇), Longchang (隆昌镇), Xinglong (兴隆镇)

Townships:

- Xiadahe Township (下达河乡), Tianshui Manchu Ethnic Township (甜水满族乡), Jidongyu Manchu Ethnic Township (吉洞峪满族乡)

== Panjin ==
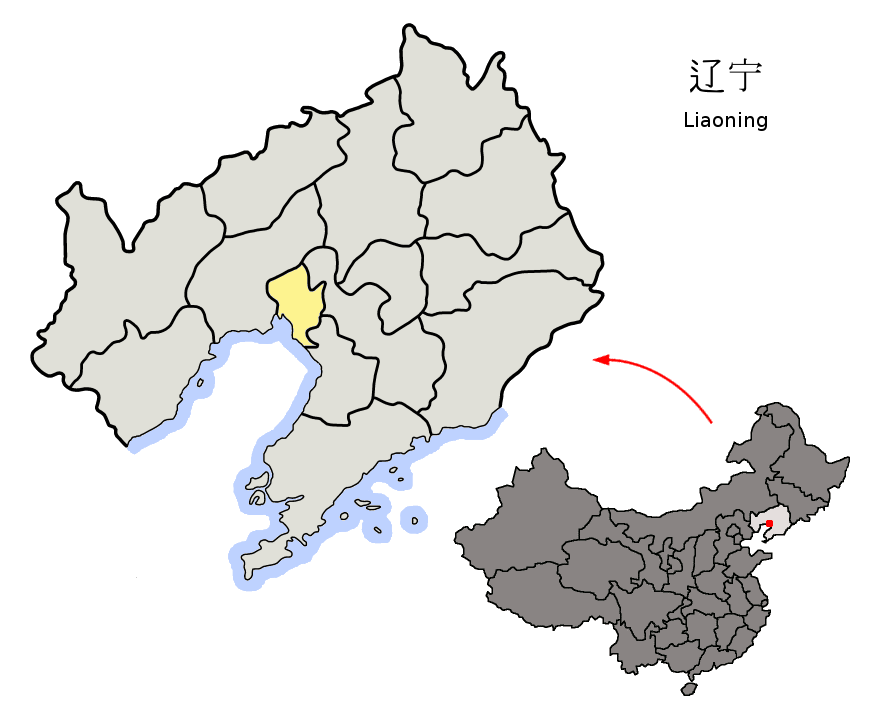
Location of Panjin in the province

=== Dawa District ===
- Subdistricts: Rongbin Subdistrict (荣滨街道), Erjiegou Subdistrict (二界沟街道), Rongxing Subdistrict (荣兴街道), Dawa Subdistrict (大洼街道), Tianjia Subdistrict (田家街道), Yushu Subdistrict (榆树街道), Xianghai Subdistrict (向海街道), Qianjin Subdistrict (前进街道)
- Towns: Tianzhuangtai (田庄台镇), Dongfeng (东风镇), Xinkai (新开镇), Qingshui (清水镇), Xinxing (新兴镇), Xi'an (西安镇), Xinli (新立镇), Tangjia (唐家镇), Ping'an Township (平安镇), Zhaoquanhe (赵圈河镇)

=== Shuangtaizi District ===
Subdistricts:

- Dongfeng Subdistrict (东风街道), Shengli Subdistrict (胜利街道), Liaohe Subdistrict (辽河街道), Hongqi Subdistrict (红旗街道), Jianshe Subdistrict (建设街道), Shiyou Subdistrict (石油街道), Huagong Subdistrict (化工街道), Shuangsheng Subdistrict (双盛街道), Tiedong Subdistrict (铁东街道)

=== Xinglongtai District ===
Subdistricts:

- Zhenxing Subdistrict (振兴街道), Xinglong Subdistrict (兴隆街道), Bohai Subdistrict (渤海街道), Xingong Subdistrict (新工街道), Yulou Subdistrict (于楼街道), Gaosheng Subdistrict (高升街道), Shuguang Subdistrict (曙光街道), Youyi Subdistrict (友谊街道), Hongcun Subdistrict (红村街道), Ping'an Subdistrict (平安街道), Xinsheng Subdistrict (新生街道), Huanxi Subdistrict (欢喜街道), Shencai Subdistrict (沈采街道), Cicai Subdistrict (茨采街道), Jincai Subdistrict (锦采街道), Xinghai Subdistrict (兴海街道), Xingsheng Subdistrict (兴盛街道), Chuangxin Subdistrict (创新街道)

=== Panshan County ===
Towns:

- Taiping (太平镇), Hujia (胡家镇), Gaosheng (高升镇), Guchengzi (古城子镇), Shaling (沙岭镇), Baqiangzi (坝墙子镇), Yangquanzi (羊圈子镇), Dongguo (东郭镇), Shixin (石新镇), Wujia (吴家镇)

Townships:

- Lujia Township (陆家乡), Tianshui Township (甜水乡), Dahuang Township (大荒乡), Chenjia Township (陈家乡)

== Tieling ==
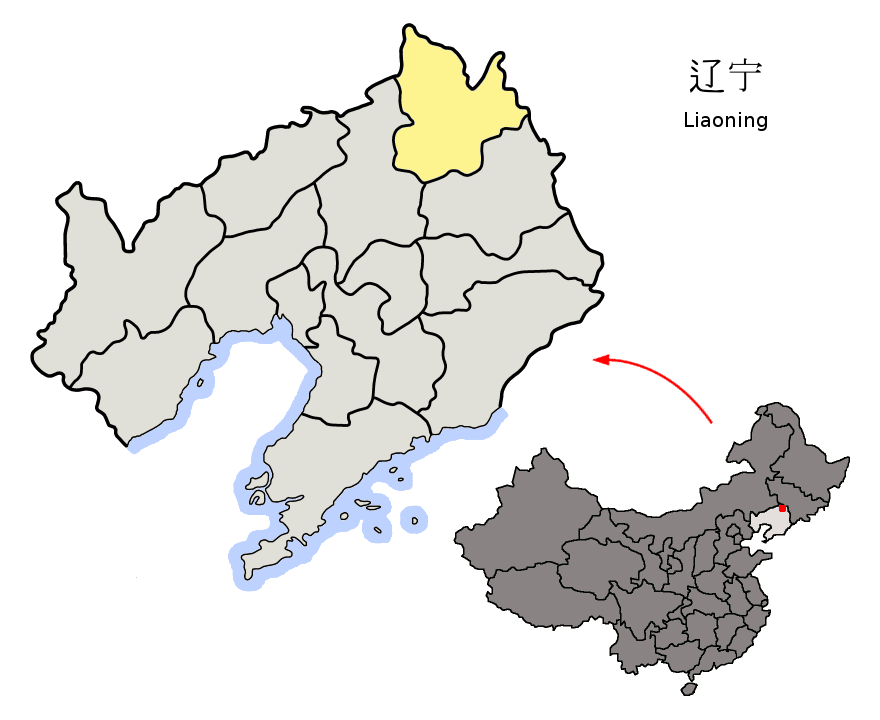
Location of Tieling in the province

=== Qinghe District ===
Subdistricts:

- Xiangyang Subdistrict (向阳街道), Hongqi Subdistrict (红旗街道)

The only town is Zhangxiang (张相镇)

Townships:

- Yangmulinzi Township (杨木林子乡), Niejia Manchu Ethnic Township (聂家满族乡)

=== Yinzhou District ===
Subdistricts:

- Hongqi Subdistrict (红旗街道), Gongren Subdistrict (工人街道), Tongzhong Subdistrict (铜钟街道), Chaihe Subdistrict (柴河街道), Tiedong Subdistrict (岭东街道), Tiexi Subdistrict (岭西街道), Liaohai Subdistrict (辽海街道)

The only township is Longshan Township (龙山乡)

Tieling Economic Development Zone (铁岭经济开发区)

=== Diaobingshan ===
Towns:

- Bingshan (兵山镇), Tiefa (铁法镇), Xiaoming (晓明镇), Gushanzi (孤山子镇), Xiaonan (晓南镇), Xiaoqing (小青镇), Daming (大明镇)

=== Kaiyuan ===
Subdistricts:

- Xincheng Subdistrict (新城街道), Laocheng Subdistrict (老城街道), Xingkai Subdistrict (兴开街道)

Towns:

- Babao (八宝镇), Qingyunbao (庆云堡镇), Kaoshan (靠山镇), Yemin (业民镇), Jingouzi (金沟子镇), Zhonggu (中固镇), Bakeshu (八棵树镇), Lianhua (莲花镇), Weiyuanbao (威远堡镇)

Townships:

- Chengdong Township (城东乡), Sanjiazi Township (三家子乡), Songshanbao Township (松山堡乡), Majiazhai Township (马家寨乡), Lijiatai Township (李家台乡), Shangbadi Manchu Ethnic Township (上肥地满族乡), Xiabadi Manchu Ethnic Township (下肥地满族乡), Huangqizhai Manchu Ethnic Township (黄旗寨满族乡), Linfeng Manchu Ethnic Township (林丰满族乡)

=== Changtu County ===
Towns:

- Changtu (昌图镇), Laocheng (老城镇), Bamiancheng (八面城镇), Sanjiangkou (三江口镇), Jinjia (金家镇), Baoli (宝力镇), Quantou (泉头镇), Shuangmiaozi (双庙子镇), Liangzhongqiao (亮中桥镇), Mazhonghe (马仲河镇), Maojiadian (毛家店镇), Laosiping (老四平镇), Dawa (大洼镇), Toudao (头道镇), Cilushu (鴜鹭树镇), Fujia (傅家镇), Sihe (四合镇), Chaoyang (朝阳镇), Guyushu (古榆树镇), Qijiazi (七家子镇), Dongga (东嘎镇), Simiancheng (四面城镇), Qianshuangjing (前双井镇)

Townships:

- Daxing Township (大兴乡), Shibajiazi Township (十八家子乡), Tongjiangkou Township (通江口乡), Dasijiazi Township (大四家子乡), Houyao Township (后窑乡), Changfa Township (长发乡), Taiping Township (太平乡), Xia'ertai Township (下二台乡), Ping'anbao Township (平安堡乡), Qujiadian Township (曲家店乡)

=== Tieling County ===
Towns:

- Aji (阿吉镇), Zhenxibao (镇西堡镇), Xintaizi (新台子镇), Yaobao (腰堡镇), Fanhe (凡河镇), Pingdingbao (平顶堡镇), Dadianzi (大甸子镇)

Townships:

- Cainiu Township (蔡牛乡), Shuangjingzi Township (双井子乡), Xiongguantun Township (熊官屯乡), Liqianhu Township (李千户乡), Jiguanshan Township (鸡冠山乡), Hengdaohezi Manchu Ethnic Township (横道河子满族乡), Baiqizhai Manchu Ethnic Township (白旗寨满族乡)

=== Xifeng County ===
Towns:

- Xifeng (西丰镇), Pinggang (平岗镇), Gaojiadian (郜家店镇), Anmin (安民镇), Zhenxing (振兴镇), Liangquan (凉泉镇), Tiande (天德镇), Fangmu (房木镇)

Townships:

- Taoran Township (陶然乡), Baiyu Township (柏榆乡), Diaoyu Township (钓鱼乡), Gengke Township (更刻乡), Mingde Manchu Ethnic Township (明德满族乡), Dexing Manchu Ethnic Township (德兴满族乡), Chengping Manchu Ethnic Township (成平满族乡), Helong Manchu Ethnic Township (和隆满族乡), Yingchang Manchu Ethnic Township (营厂满族乡), Jinxing Manchu Ethnic Township (金星满族乡)

== Yingkou ==
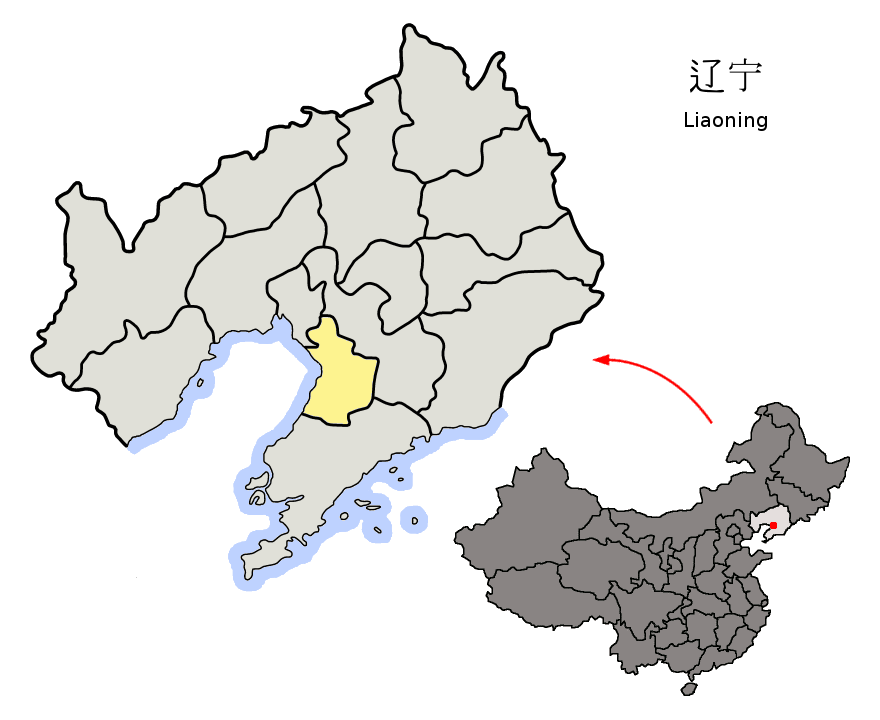
Location of Yingkou in the province

=== Bayuquan District ===
Subdistricts:

- Honghai Subdistrict (红海街道), Haixing Subdistrict (海星街道), Wanghai Subdistrict (望海街道), Haidong Subdistrict (海东街道)

Towns:

- Xiongyue (熊岳镇), Lutun (芦屯镇), Hongqi (红旗镇)

=== Laobian District ===
Subdistricts:

- Laobian Subdistrict (老边街道), Chengdong Subdistrict (城东街道)

Towns:

- Lunan (路南镇), Liushu (柳树镇), Laobian Town (老边镇), Erdaogou (二道沟镇)

=== Xishi District ===
Subdistricts:

- Wutaizi Subdistrict (五台子街道), Yushi Subdistrict (渔市街道), Desheng Subdistrict (得胜街道), Qinghua Subdistrict (清华街道), Hebei Subdistrict (河北街道), Shengli Subdistrict (胜利街道), Xishichang Subdistrict (西市场街道)

=== Zhanqian District ===
Subdistricts:

- Yuejin Subdistrict (跃进街道), Jianshe Subdistrict (建设街道), Batiandi Subdistrict (八田地街道), Dongfeng Subdistrict (东风街道), Xinxing Subdistrict (新兴街道), Jianfeng Subdistrict (建丰街道), Xinjian Subdistrict (新建街道)

=== Dashiqiao ===
Subdistricts:

- Shiqiao Subdistrict (石桥街道), Qinghua Subdistrict (青花街道), Jinqiao Subdistrict (金桥街道), Gangdu Subdistrict (钢都街道), Nanlou Subdistrict (南楼街道)

Towns:

- Shuiyuan (水源镇), Gouyan (沟沿镇), Shifo (石佛镇), Gaokan (高坎镇), Qikou (旗口镇), Huzhuang (虎庄镇), Guantun (官屯镇), Boluopu (博洛铺镇), Yong'an (永安镇), Tangchi (汤池镇), Huangtuling (黄土岭镇), Zhoujia (周家镇)

=== Gaizhou ===
Subdistricts:

- Gulou Subdistrict (鼓楼街道), Xicheng Subdistrict (西城街道), Dongcheng Subdistrict (东城街道), Taiyangsheng Subdistrict (太阳升街道), Tuanshan Subdistrict (团山街道), Xihai Subdistrict (西海街道)

Towns:

- Gaotun (高屯镇), Shagang (沙岗镇), Jiulongdi (九垄地镇), Jiuzhai (九寨镇), Wanfu (万福镇), Wolongquan (卧龙泉镇), Qingshiling (青石岭镇), Nuanquan (暖泉镇), Guizhou (归州镇), Bangshibao (榜式堡镇), Tuandian (团甸镇), Shuangtai (双台镇), Yangyun (杨运镇), Xutun (徐屯镇), Shenzijie (什字街镇), Kuangdonggou (矿洞沟镇), Chentun (陈屯镇), Liangtun (梁屯镇),

Townships:

- Xiaoshipeng Township (小石棚乡), Guoyuan Township (果园乡), Ertai Township (二台乡)
