= Xinfu =

Xinfu may refer to the following locations in China:

- Xinfu District, Fushun (新抚区), Liaoning
- Xinfu District, Xinzhou (忻府区), Shanxi
- Xinfu, Heng County (新福镇), town in and subdivision of Heng County, Guangxi
- Xinfu railway station, a railway station on the Taiwan Railways Administration West Coast line

== Subdistricts ==
- Xinfu Subdistrict, Shantou (新福街道), subdivision of Jinping District, Shantou, Guangdong
- Xinfu Subdistrict, Qitaihe (新富街道), subdivision of Qiezihe District, Qitaihe, Heilongjiang
- Xinfu Subdistrict, Fushun (新抚街道), subdivision of Xinfu District, Fushun, Liaoning

== Townships ==
- Xinfu Township, Suibin County (新富乡), subdivision of Suibin County, Heilongjiang
- Xinfu Township, Zhaozhou County (新福乡), subdivision of Zhaozhou County, Heilongjiang

== See also ==
- Xingfu (disambiguation)
