= Wusheng =

Wusheng may refer to:

== Place ==
- Wusheng County (武胜县), a county in eastern Sichuan, China
- Wusheng Township (武圣乡), a township in Muchuan County, Sichuan, China
- Wusheng Subdistrict (武圣街道), a subdistrict of Baita District, Liaoyang, Liaoning, China
- Sheng role#Wusheng (武生, "martial gentlemen"), a male role type in Chinese opera

== People ==
- Wu Sheng (academic), Chinese nuclear material and process specialist and academic, member of the Chinese Academy of Engineering.
- Wu Sheng (writer) (吳晟), originally named Wu Shêng-hsiung (吳勝雄), a Taiwanese writer.

== See also ==
- Guan Yu (died 220), Han dynasty general who became a deity in Chinese folk religion, often called "Wusheng" (武聖; "Saint of War")
