= Longwangmiao =

Lóngwángmiào (Chinese: 龙王庙; lit. 'Dragon King temple') may refer to the following locations in China:

Towns

- Longwangmiao, Daming County, Hebei
- Longwangmiao, Liaoning, in Donggang
- Longwangmiao, Shandong, in Shan County

Township

- Longwangmiao Township, Qinglong Manchu Autonomous County, Hebei

Village

- Longwangmiao, Gaocheng, a village in Gaocheng, Sui County, Suizhou, Hubei
