= Liushan Subdistrict =

Liushan Subdistrict 刘山街道
- Subdistrict
- Location in Liaoning
- Coordinates: 41.8256°N 123.8954°E
- Country: People's Republic of China
- Province: Liaoning
- Prefecture-level city: Fushun
- District: Xinfu District
- Time zone: UTC+8 (China Standard)

Liushan Subdistrict (simplified Chinese: 刘山街道; traditional Chinese: 劉山街道; pinyin: Liúshān Jiēdào) is a subdistrict in Xinfu District, Fushun, Liaoning province, China. As of 2020, it has ten residential neighborhoods under its administration:

- Hudielou Community (蝴蝶楼社区)
- Jianyifang Community (简易房社区)
- Xinliushan Community (新刘山社区)
- Xinzhou Community (欣洲社区)
- Antai Community (安泰社区)
- Shengdi Community (盛地社区)
- Hubian Community (湖边社区)
- Shiyichangzhuzhai Community (十一厂住宅社区)
- Huayuan Community (花园社区)
- Sanli Community (三利社区)

== See also ==
- List of township-level divisions of Liaoning
