= Xiaoshi =

Xiaoshi may refer to:

- Xiaoshi, Benxi County (小市镇), town and county seat of Benxi Manchu Autonomous County, Liaoning, China
- Xiaoshi, Huaining County (小市镇), town in Huaining County, Anhui, China
- Xiaoshi Middle School, in Ningbo, Zhejiang, China
