= Huadong Subdistrict, Fuxin =

Huadong Subdistrict 华东街道
- Subdistrict
- Location in Liaoning
- Coordinates: 42°1′31″N 121°40′56″E
- Country: People's Republic of China
- Province: Liaoning
- Prefecture-level city: Fuxin
- District: Xihe District
- Time zone: UTC+8 (China Standard)

Huadong Subdistrict (simplified Chinese: 华东街道; traditional Chinese: 華東街道; pinyin: Huádōng Jiēdào) is a subdistrict in Xihe District, Fuxin, Liaoning, China. In 2018, it had five residential communities under its administration.

== See also ==
- List of township-level divisions of Liaoning
