= Changchun Subdistrict =

Changchun Subdistrict 长春街道
- Subdistrict
- Location in Liaoning
- Coordinates: 41°53′33″N 123°55′30″E
- Country: People's Republic of China
- Province: Liaoning
- Prefecture-level city: Fushun
- District: Shuncheng District
- Time zone: UTC+8 (China Standard)

Changchun Subdistrict (simplified Chinese: 长春街道; traditional Chinese: 長春街道; pinyin: Chángchūn Jiēdào) is a subdistrict in Shuncheng District, Fushun, Liaoning province, China. As of 2018, it has 12 residential communities under its administration.

== See also ==
- List of township-level divisions of Liaoning
