= Xingfu =

Xingfu, meaning "happy" in Chinese, especially the happy in a family, is used in many place names in China and Taiwan:

- Xingfu Community (幸福社区)
  - Xingfu, Zhucheng, in Zhucheng Subdistrict, Xinzhou District, Wuhan, Hubei
- Xingfu station (幸福站)
  - Xingfu metro station, Xinzhuang, New Taipei
- Xingfu Subdistrict (幸福街道)
  - Xingfu Subdistrict, Qiqihar, Heilongjiang
  - Xingfu Subdistrict, Baicheng, Jilin
  - Xingfu Subdistrict, Nantong, Jiangsu
  - Xingfu Subdistrict, Suqian, Jiangsu
  - Xingfu Subdistrict, Nanchang, Jiangxi
- Xingfu Town (幸福镇)
  - Xingfu, Harbin, in Xiangfang District, Harbin, Heilongjiang
  - Xingfu, Dujiangyan, Sichuan
  - Xingfu Town, Yunnan, in Yun County
- Xingfu Township (幸福乡)
  - Xingfu Township, Anhui, in Langxi County
  - Xingfu Township, Heihe, Heilongjiang
  - Xingfu Township, Huanan County, Heilongjiang
  - Xingfu Township, Hunan, in Huarong County
  - Xingfu Township, Inner Mongolia, in Taibus Banner, Xilin Gol League
  - Xingfu Township, Jiangsu, in Gangzha District, Nantong
  - Xingfu Township, Changchun, Jilin
  - Xingfu Township, Taonan, Jilin
  - Xingfu Township, Ningnan County, Sichuan
  - Xingfu Township, Santai County, Sichuan
  - Xingfu Township, Yunnan, in Yun County

== See also ==
- Xinfu (disambiguation)
