= Tieshan Subdistrict, Dalian =

Tieshan Subdistrict 铁山街道
- Subdistrict
- Location in Liaoning
- Coordinates: 38°47′30″N 121°11′5″E
- Country: People's Republic of China
- Province: Liaoning
- Prefecture-level city: Dalian
- District: Lüshunkou District
- Time zone: UTC+8 (China Standard)

Tieshan Subdistrict (simplified Chinese: 铁山街道; traditional Chinese: 鐵山街道; pinyin: Tiěshān Jiēdào) is a subdistrict in Lüshunkou District, Dalian, Liaoning, China. As of 2020, it administers the following fifteen villages:

- Jiucaifang Village (韭菜房村)
- Jinjia Village (金家村)
- Muyangcheng Village (牧羊城村)
- Bailanzi Village (柏岚子村)
- Duizhuanggou Village (对庄沟村)
- Wangjia Village (王家村)
- Zhangjiagou Village (张家沟村)
- Guojia Village (郭家村)
- Zhangjia Village (张家村)
- Nanyahuzui Village (南鸦户嘴村)
- Zhongyahuzui Village (中鸦户嘴村)
- Beiyahuzui Village (北鸦户嘴村)
- Yangshugou Village (杨树沟村)
- Daliujia Village (大刘家村)
- Chenjia Village (陈家村)

== See also ==
- List of township-level divisions of Liaoning
