= Guanyinge Subdistrict, Benxi County =

Guanyinge Subdistrict 观音阁街道
- Subdistrict
- Location in Liaoning
- Coordinates: 41°18′09″N 124°07′14″E
- Country: People's Republic of China
- Province: Liaoning
- Prefecture-level city: Benxi
- County: Benxi
- Elevation: 204 m (669 ft)
- Time zone: UTC+8 (China Standard)
- Postal code: 117100
- Area code: 0414

Guanyinge Subdistrict (simplified Chinese: 观音阁街道; traditional Chinese: 觀音閣街道; pinyin: Guānyīngé Jiēdào; lit. 'Guanyin Temple') is a subdistrict in and the seat of Benxi Manchu Autonomous County, Liaoning province, China. As of 2011, it has 11 residential communities (社区) and 3 villages under its administration.

== See also ==
- List of township-level divisions of Liaoning
