= Guanyinge Subdistrict, Beizhen =

Guanyinge Subdistrict 观音阁街道
- Subdistrict
- Location in Liaoning
- Coordinates: 41°35′48″N 121°46′25″E
- Country: People's Republic of China
- Province: Liaoning
- Prefecture-level city: Jinzhou
- County-level city: Beizhen
- Elevation: 71 m (233 ft)
- Time zone: UTC+8 (China Standard)
- Postal code: 121300
- Area code: 0416

Guanyinge Subdistrict (simplified Chinese: 观音阁街道; traditional Chinese: 觀音閣街道; pinyin: Guānyīngé Jiēdào; lit. 'Guanyin Temple') is a subdistrict of the city of Beizhen, Liaoning province, China. As of 2011, it has one village, Hewa (河洼村) under its administration.

== See also ==
- List of township-level divisions of Liaoning
