= Wanghua District =

Wanghua District 望花区
- District
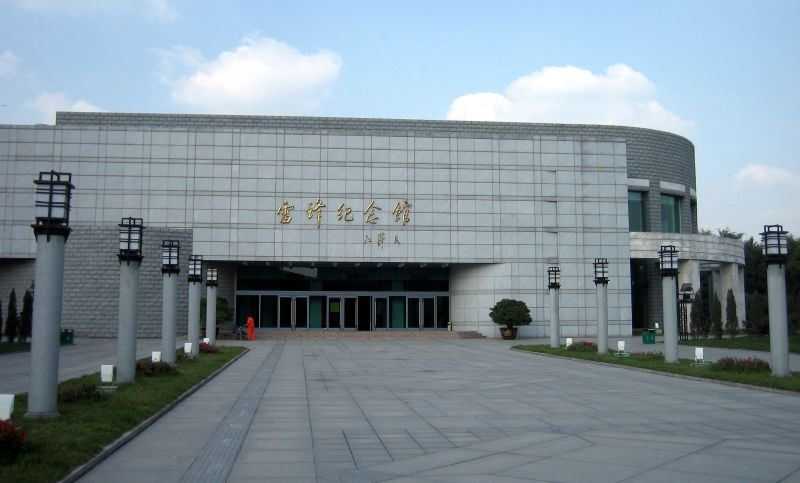

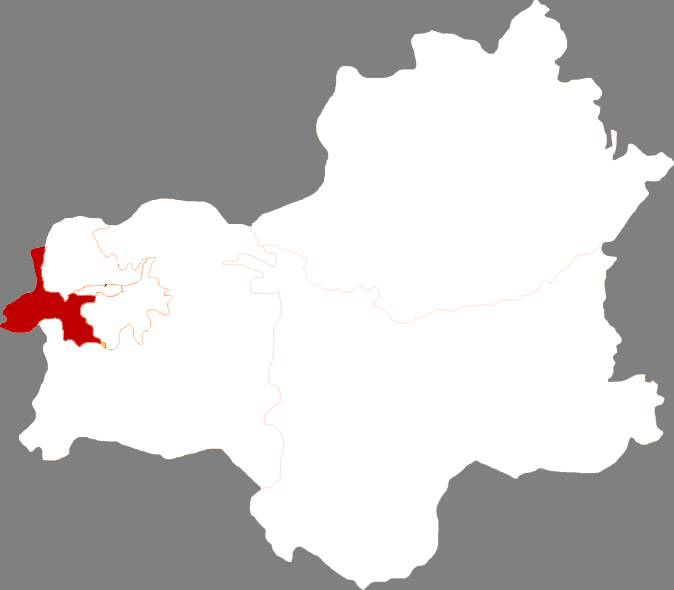
- Wanghua in Fushun

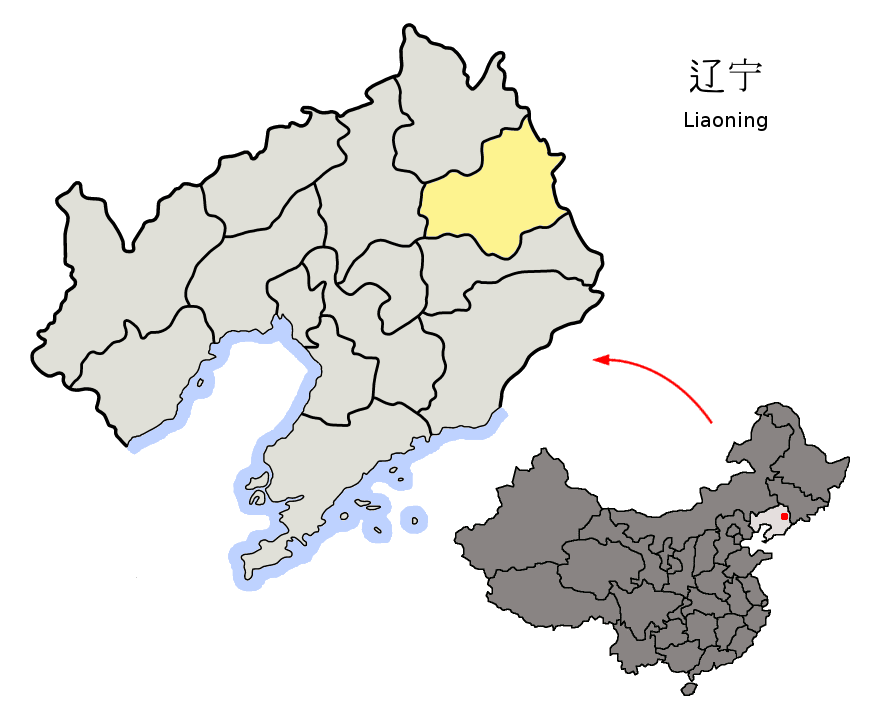
- Fushun in Liaoning
- Coordinates: 41°51′14″N 123°47′02″E
- Country: People's Republic of China
- Province: Liaoning
- Prefecture-level city: Fushun

Area
  - Total: 307.1 km^{2} (118.6 sq mi)

Population (2020 census)
  - Total: 396,257
  - Density: 1,290/km^{2} (3,342/sq mi)
- Time zone: UTC+8 (China Standard)

Wanghua District (simplified Chinese: 望花区; traditional Chinese: 望花區; pinyin: Wànghuā Qū), is one of the four districts under the administration of the city of Fushun, Liaoning province, People's Republic of China. The westernmost county-level division of Fushun, it has a population of about 396,257 in 2020, covering an area of 307 square kilometres (119 sq mi).

== Administrative divisions ==
There are 10 subdistricts and one town in the district.

Subdistricts:

- Jianshe Subdistrict (建设街道), Wulaotun Subdistrict (五老屯街道), Guchengzi Subdistrict (古城子街道), Binwu Subdistrict (演武街道), Putun Subdistrict (朴屯街道), Guangming Subdistrict (光明街道), Heping Subdistrict (和平街道), Gongnong Subdistrict (工农街道), Tiantun Subdistrict (田屯街道), Xinmin Subdistrict (新民街道)

The only town is Tayu (塔峪镇)
