= Yulin Subdistrict, Fushun =

Yulin Subdistrict 榆林街道
- Subdistrict
- Location in Liaoning
- Coordinates: 41°52′10″N 123°56′24″E
- Country: People's Republic of China
- Province: Liaoning
- Prefecture-level city: Fushun
- District: Xinfu District
- Time zone: UTC+8 (China Standard)

Yulin Subdistrict (Chinese: 榆林街道; pinyin: Yúlín Jiēdào) is a subdistrict in Xinfu District, Fushun, Liaoning, China. As of 2018, it has 3 residential communities and 2 villages under its administration.

== See also ==
- List of township-level divisions of Liaoning
