= Shuangmiao Township, Liaoning =

Shuangmiao Township 双庙乡
- Township
- Location in Liaoning
- Coordinates: 42°24′28″N 122°22′05″E
- Country: People's Republic of China
- Province: Liaoning
- Prefecture-level city: Fuxin
- County: Zhangwu
- Elevation: 98 m (322 ft)
- Time zone: UTC+8 (China Standard)
- Postal code: 123217
- Area code: 0418

Shuangmiao Township (simplified Chinese: 双庙乡; traditional Chinese: 雙廟鄉; pinyin: Shuāngmiào Xiāng; lit. 'double temple') is a township of Zhangwu County in northern Liaoning province, China, located about 14 kilometres (8.7 mi) west of the county seat and 72 km (45 mi) northeast of downtown Fuxin. As of 2011, it has 7 villages under its administration.

== See also ==
- List of township-level divisions of Liaoning
