= Haizhou District, Fuxin =

Haizhou 海州区
- District
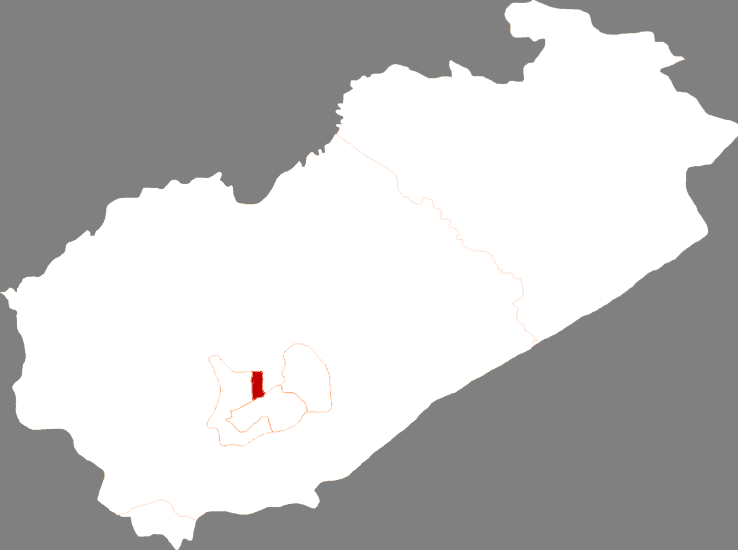
- Location in Fuxin

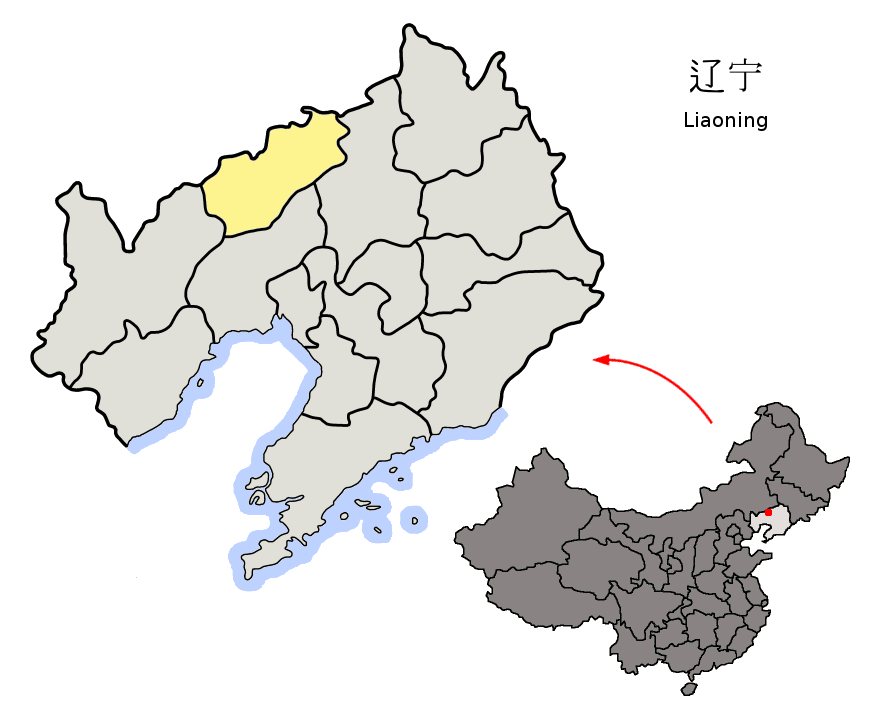
- Fuxin in Liaoning
- Coordinates: 42°10′35″N 121°39′01″E
- Country: China
- Province: Liaoning
- Prefecture-level city: Fuxin
- District seat: Xishan Subdistrict

Area
  - Total: 66.81 km^{2} (25.80 sq mi)

Population (2020 census)
  - Total: 234,029
  - Density: 3,503/km^{2} (9,072/sq mi)
- Time zone: UTC+8 (China Standard)
- Division code: HZF
- Website: www.fxhz.gov.cn

Haizhou District (simplified Chinese: 海州区; traditional Chinese: 海州區; pinyin: Hǎizhōu Qū; lit. 'Sea State') is a district of Fuxin, Liaoning, China.

== Administrative divisions ==
There are six subdistricts and one town within the district.

6 subdistricts

Heping Subdistrict (和平街道), Xishan Subdistrict (西山街道), Hebei Subdistrict (河北街道), Zhanqian Subdistrict (站前街道), Wulong Subdistrict (五龙街道), Ping'an West Subdistrict (平安西部街道)

1 town

The only town is Hanjiadian (韩家店镇)
