= Benxi Manchu Autonomous County =

Benxi 本溪县 ᠪᡝᠨᠰᡳ ᠰᡳᠶᠠᠨ
- Autonomous county
- 本溪满族自治县 ᠪᡝᠨᠰᡳ ᠮᠠᠨᠵᡠ ᠪᡝᠶᡝ ᡩᠠᠰᠠᠩᡤᠠ ᠰᡳᠶᠠᠨ; Benxi Manchu Autonomous County
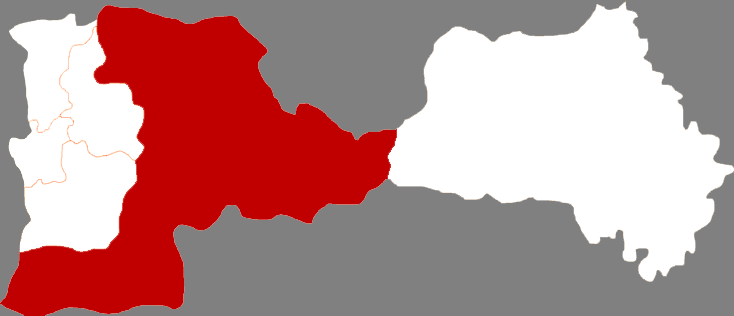
- Benxi County in Benxi City

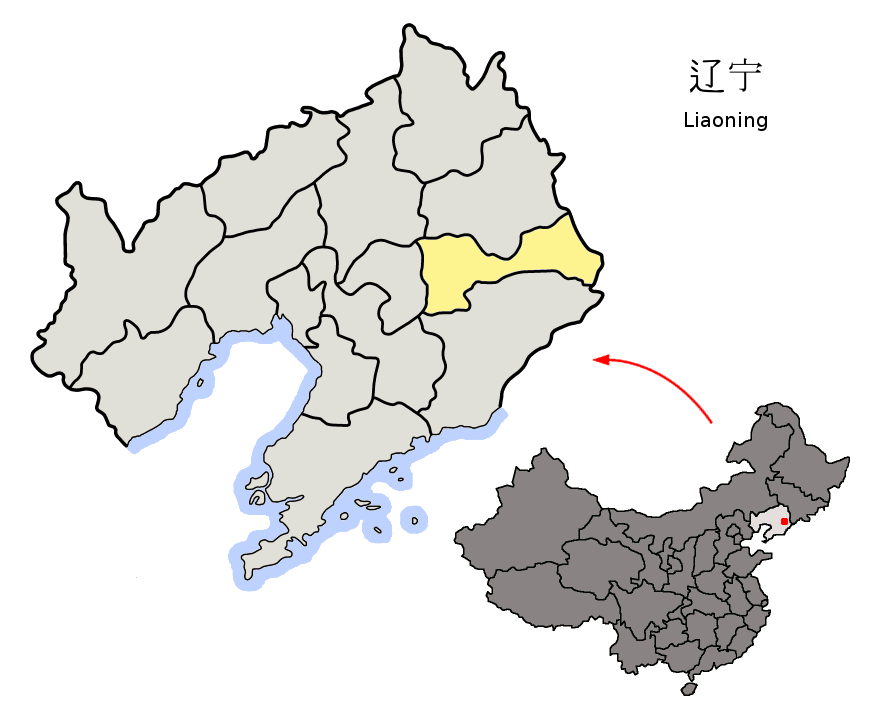
- Benxi City in Liaoning
- Coordinates: 41°18′06″N 124°07′12″E
- Country: China
- Province: Liaoning
- Prefecture-level city: Benxi
- County seat: Xiaoshi

Area
  - Total: 3,362 km^{2} (1,298 sq mi)
- Elevation: 205 m (673 ft)

Population (2020 census)
  - Total: 230,850
  - Density: 68.66/km^{2} (177.8/sq mi)
- Time zone: UTC+8 (China Standard)
- Postal code: 117100
- Area code: 0414
- Website: www.bx.gov.cn

Benxi Manchu Autonomous County (simplified Chinese: 本溪满族自治县; traditional Chinese: 本溪滿族自治縣; pinyin: Běnxī Mǎnzú Zìzhìxiàn; Manchu: ᠪᡝᠨᠰᡳ ᠮᠠᠨᠵᡠ ᠪᡝᠶᡝ ᡩᠠᠰᠠᠩᡤᠠ ᠰᡳᠶᠠᠨ; Möllendorff: bensi manju beye dasangga siyan) is an autonomous county under the administration of the prefecture-level city of Benxi, in the east of Liaoning province, China. It has a total area of 3,362 square kilometres (1,298 sq mi), and a population of approximately 300,000 people as of 2002.

The city is home to a sizable Manchu and Hui population.

== Administrative divisions ==
There is one subdistrict, 10 towns, and one townships within the county:

The only subdistrict is Guanyinge Subdistrict (观音阁街道).

10 towns are: Xiaoshi (小市镇), Caohezhang (草河掌镇), Caohecheng (草河城镇), Caohekou (草河口镇), Lianshanguan (连山关镇), Qinghecheng (清河城镇), Tianshifu (田师傅镇), Nandianzi (南甸子镇), Jianchang (碱厂镇), Pianling (偏岭镇), Gaoguan (高官镇).

The only township is Dongyingfang Township (东营房乡).

== Climate ==
Climate data for Benxi County, elevation 259 m (850 ft), (1991–2020 normals, extremes 1991–present)
| Month | Jan | Feb | Mar | Apr | May | Jun | Jul | Aug | Sep | Oct | Nov | Dec | Year |
|---|---|---|---|---|---|---|---|---|---|---|---|---|---|
| Record high °C (°F) | 7.1 (44.8) | 15.4 (59.7) | 19.3 (66.7) | 31.1 (88.0) | 33.1 (91.6) | 37.7 (99.9) | 39.2 (102.6) | 39.6 (103.3) | 33.1 (91.6) | 28.7 (83.7) | 19.6 (67.3) | 10.6 (51.1) | 39.6 (103.3) |
| Mean daily maximum °C (°F) | −4.5 (23.9) | −0.1 (31.8) | 6.9 (44.4) | 16.1 (61.0) | 22.7 (72.9) | 26.5 (79.7) | 28.8 (83.8) | 28.4 (83.1) | 23.9 (75.0) | 16.2 (61.2) | 5.9 (42.6) | −2.4 (27.7) | 14.0 (57.3) |
| Daily mean °C (°F) | −11.5 (11.3) | −6.7 (19.9) | 0.8 (33.4) | 9.5 (49.1) | 16.2 (61.2) | 20.8 (69.4) | 24.0 (75.2) | 22.9 (73.2) | 17.0 (62.6) | 9.2 (48.6) | 0.1 (32.2) | −8.5 (16.7) | 7.8 (46.1) |
| Mean daily minimum °C (°F) | −16.8 (1.8) | −12.3 (9.9) | −4.5 (23.9) | 3.4 (38.1) | 10.0 (50.0) | 15.6 (60.1) | 19.9 (67.8) | 18.7 (65.7) | 11.6 (52.9) | 3.6 (38.5) | −4.8 (23.4) | −13.3 (8.1) | 2.6 (36.7) |
| Record low °C (°F) | −33.2 (−27.8) | −26.6 (−15.9) | −19.3 (−2.7) | −9.8 (14.4) | −1.1 (30.0) | 5.6 (42.1) | 11.1 (52.0) | 6.0 (42.8) | 0.3 (32.5) | −9.1 (15.6) | −23.0 (−9.4) | −26.5 (−15.7) | −33.2 (−27.8) |
| Average precipitation mm (inches) | 7.8 (0.31) | 12.6 (0.50) | 19.2 (0.76) | 43.5 (1.71) | 67.1 (2.64) | 116.1 (4.57) | 163.7 (6.44) | 200.4 (7.89) | 56.2 (2.21) | 49.8 (1.96) | 31.2 (1.23) | 12.3 (0.48) | 779.9 (30.7) |
| Average precipitation days (≥ 0.1 mm) | 5.4 | 5.4 | 7.0 | 8.1 | 10.6 | 13.0 | 13.8 | 12.5 | 8.3 | 7.9 | 7.8 | 6.4 | 106.2 |
| Average snowy days | 8.4 | 7.4 | 7.1 | 2.0 | 0 | 0 | 0 | 0 | 0 | 1.2 | 7.2 | 9.1 | 42.4 |
| Average relative humidity (%) | 64 | 59 | 54 | 51 | 59 | 69 | 77 | 79 | 74 | 66 | 64 | 65 | 65 |
| Mean monthly sunshine hours | 176.2 | 185.1 | 216.0 | 219.8 | 245.6 | 218.5 | 194.0 | 202.7 | 216.2 | 200.4 | 159.5 | 156.9 | 2,390.9 |
| Percentage possible sunshine | 59 | 61 | 58 | 55 | 54 | 48 | 43 | 48 | 58 | 59 | 54 | 55 | 54 |
Source: China Meteorological Administration

Climate data for Caohekou Town, Benxi County, elevation 234 m (768 ft), (1991–2020 normals)
| Month | Jan | Feb | Mar | Apr | May | Jun | Jul | Aug | Sep | Oct | Nov | Dec | Year |
|---|---|---|---|---|---|---|---|---|---|---|---|---|---|
| Mean daily maximum °C (°F) | −4.2 (24.4) | −0.2 (31.6) | 6.4 (43.5) | 15.2 (59.4) | 21.7 (71.1) | 25.1 (77.2) | 27.3 (81.1) | 27.6 (81.7) | 23.2 (73.8) | 15.6 (60.1) | 5.4 (41.7) | −2.7 (27.1) | 13.4 (56.1) |
| Daily mean °C (°F) | −11.2 (11.8) | −7.0 (19.4) | 0.1 (32.2) | 8.1 (46.6) | 14.6 (58.3) | 19.3 (66.7) | 22.7 (72.9) | 22.1 (71.8) | 15.9 (60.6) | 8.0 (46.4) | −0.8 (30.6) | −9.1 (15.6) | 6.9 (44.4) |
| Mean daily minimum °C (°F) | −16.7 (1.9) | −12.7 (9.1) | −5.4 (22.3) | 1.4 (34.5) | 8.0 (46.4) | 14.3 (57.7) | 19.1 (66.4) | 18.1 (64.6) | 10.4 (50.7) | 2.2 (36.0) | −5.8 (21.6) | −14.1 (6.6) | 1.6 (34.8) |
| Average precipitation mm (inches) | 6.7 (0.26) | 13.9 (0.55) | 19.4 (0.76) | 43.7 (1.72) | 73.5 (2.89) | 113.9 (4.48) | 205.0 (8.07) | 233.0 (9.17) | 61.4 (2.42) | 47.1 (1.85) | 29.6 (1.17) | 12.5 (0.49) | 859.7 (33.83) |
| Average precipitation days (≥ 0.1 mm) | 4.4 | 5.3 | 6.2 | 8.0 | 10.2 | 13.1 | 15.2 | 12.9 | 8.1 | 7.5 | 7.2 | 6.3 | 104.4 |
| Average snowy days | 6.8 | 7.0 | 6.3 | 1.4 | 0 | 0 | 0 | 0 | 0 | 0.8 | 6.2 | 8.1 | 36.6 |
| Average relative humidity (%) | 63 | 62 | 61 | 60 | 69 | 80 | 86 | 86 | 81 | 73 | 69 | 67 | 71 |
| Mean monthly sunshine hours | 196.5 | 194.3 | 220.9 | 221.5 | 235.2 | 175.3 | 131.9 | 165.9 | 206.7 | 194.9 | 162.1 | 165.7 | 2,270.9 |
| Percentage possible sunshine | 66 | 64 | 59 | 55 | 52 | 39 | 29 | 39 | 56 | 57 | 55 | 58 | 52 |
Source: China Meteorological Administration
