= Hebei Subdistrict, Fuxin =

Hebei Subdistrict 河北街道
- Subdistrict
- Location in Liaoning
- Coordinates: 42°0′8″N 121°38′8″E
- Country: People's Republic of China
- Province: Liaoning
- Prefecture-level city: Fuxin
- District: Haizhou District
- Time zone: UTC+8 (China Standard)

Hebei Subdistrict (Chinese: 河北街道; pinyin: Héběi Jiēdào) is a subdistrict in Haizhou District, Fuxin, Liaoning province, China. As of 2020, it has nine residential communities under its administration:

- Hebei Community
- Yucai Community (育才社区)
- Qingnian Community (青年社区)
- Hongqi Community (红旗社区)
- Xiyiyuan Community (西颐园社区)
- Guxiangyuan Community (古香园社区)
- Xihuayuan Community (西华园社区)
- Sanyiba Community (三一八社区)
- Jiaoyu Community (教育社区)

== See also ==
- List of township-level divisions of Liaoning
