= Xihe District =

Coordinates: 42°01′31″N 121°40′48″E

Xihe 细河区
- District
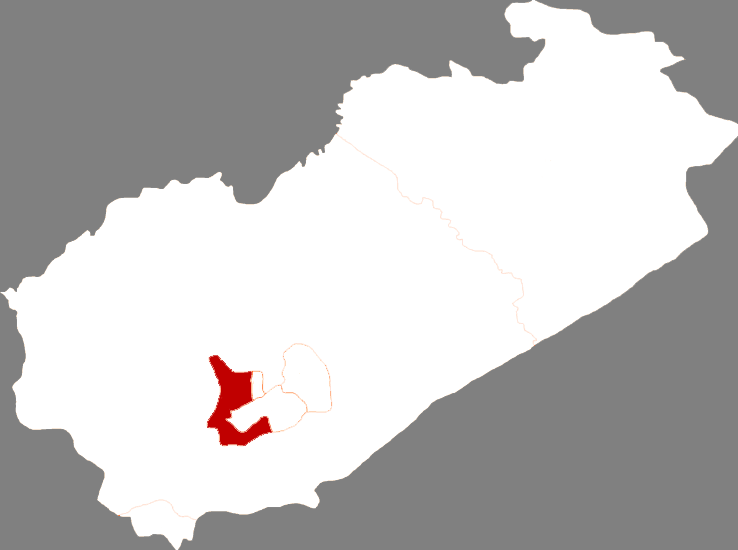
- Location in Fuxin
- Country: People's Republic of China
- Province: Liaoning
- Prefecture-level city: Fuxin

Area
  - Total: 102.2 km^{2} (39.5 sq mi)

Population (2020 census)
  - Total: 273,525
  - Density: 2,676/km^{2} (6,932/sq mi)
- Time zone: UTC+8 (China Standard)

Xihe District (simplified Chinese: 细河区; traditional Chinese: 細河區; pinyin: Xìhé Qū) is a district of Fuxin City, Liaoning province, People's Republic of China.

== Administrative Divisions ==
There are six subdistricts and one town within the district.

Subdistricts:

- Xiyuan Subdistrict (西苑街道), Beiyuan Subdistrict (北苑街道), Dongyuan Subdistrict (东苑街道), Xueyuan Subdistrict (学苑街道), Huadong Subdistrict (华东街道), Zhongyuan Subdistrict (中苑街道)

The only town is Sihe (四合镇)
