= Donggongyuan Subdistrict =

Subdistrict of Fushun, Liaoning, China

Donggongyuan Subdistrict (Chinese: 东公园街道) is a subdistrict in Xinfu District, Fushun, Liaoning, China.
