= Fumin Subdistrict =

Subdistrict of Fushun, Liaoning, China

Fumin Subdistrict (Chinese: 福民街道) is a subdistrict in Xinfu District, Fushun, Liaoning, China.
