= Tianshifu =

Town in Benxi, Liaoning, China

Coordinates: 41°14′33″N 124°20′56″E

Tianshifu 田师傅镇
- Town
- Interactive map of Tianshifu
- Country: China
- Province: Liaoning
- Prefecture-level city: Benxi
- Autonomous county: Benxi County
- Subdivisions: 14: 8 residential communities 5 administrative villages

Tianshifu (simplified Chinese: 田师傅; traditional Chinese: 田師府; pinyin: Tiánshīfǔ) is a town in Benxi Manchu Autonomous County, Liaoning Province, Northeast China.
