= Xiaoshi, Liaoning =

Xiaoshi 小市镇 ᠰᡳᠠᠣ ᠰᡥᡳ ᡠᡴᠰᡠᡵᠠᡳ
- Town
- Location in Liaoning Xiaoshi (China)
- Coordinates: 41°17′48″N 124°07′10″E
- Country: People's Republic of China
- Province: Liaoning
- Prefecture-level city: Benxi
- County: Benxi

Area
  - Total: 433 km^{2} (167 sq mi)
- Elevation: 206 m (676 ft)

Population
  - Total: 96,700
  - Density: 223/km^{2} (578/sq mi)
- Time zone: UTC+8 (China Standard)
- Postal code: 117100
- Area code: 0414

Xiaoshi (Chinese: 小市; pinyin: Xiǎoshì; lit. 'little city'), Manchu: ᠰᡳᠠᠣ
ᠰᡥᡳ, Möllendorff romanization: Siao shi) is a town in and the former seat of Benxi Manchu Autonomous County in eastern Liaoning province, China. As of 2011, it has 18 villages under its administration.

== Administrative Divisions ==
The small town has the following areas:

- Xiangmo
- Shangbao
- Xiabao
- Chenggou
- Xiejiawaizi
- Tongjiangyu
- Qingshiling
- Shanchengzi
- Chenying
- Jiucaiyu
- Jianchangbu
- Moshiyu
- Guizishi
- Sanguange
- Fengmenglazi
- Tanjiabaozi
- Yaobao
- Sailizhai

== See also ==
- List of township-level divisions of Liaoning
