= Wusheng Township =

Wusheng Township 武圣乡
- Township
- Location in Sichuan
- Coordinates: 28°58′43″N 103°45′05″E
- Country: People's Republic of China
- Province: Sichuan
- Prefecture-level city: Leshan
- County: Muchuan County
- Time zone: UTC+8 (China Standard)

Wusheng Township (simplified Chinese: 武圣乡; traditional Chinese: 武聖鄉; pinyin: Wǔshèng Xiāng) is a township under the administration of Muchuan County in Sichuan, China. As of 2018, it has one residential community and 13 villages under its administration.

== See also ==
- List of township-level divisions of Sichuan
