= Yong'antai Subdistrict =

Subdistrict of Fushun, Liaoning, China

Yong'antai Subdistrict (Chinese: 永安台街道) is a subdistrict in Xinfu District, Fushun, Liaoning, China.
