= Shuncheng District =

Shuncheng 顺城区
- District
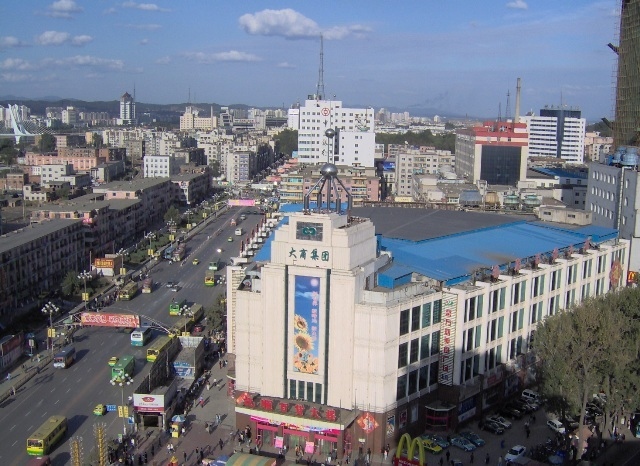

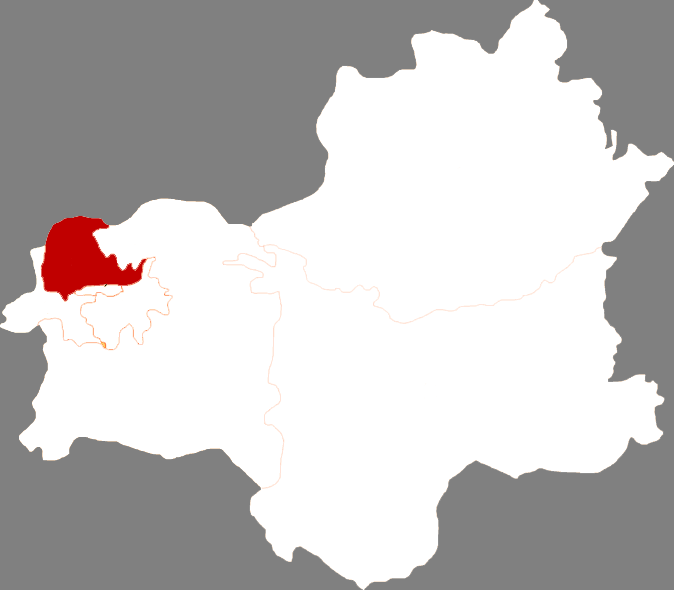
- Shuncheng in Fushun

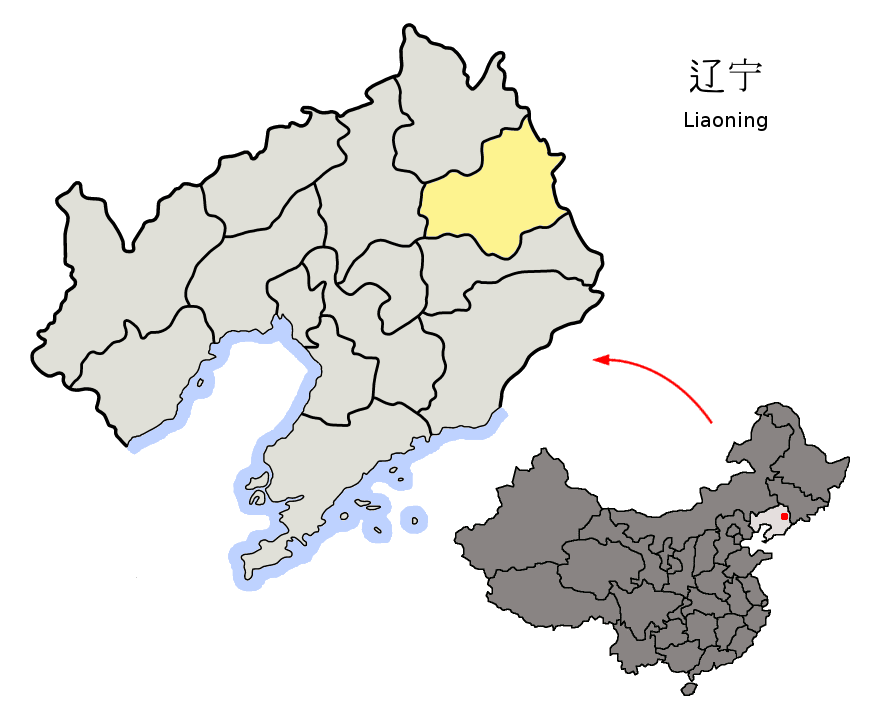
- Fushun in Liaoning
- Coordinates: 41°53′00″N 123°56′42″E
- Country: China
- Province: Liaoning
- Prefecture-level city: Fushun
- District seat: Changchun Subdistrict

Area
  - Total: 347.44 km^{2} (134.15 sq mi)

Population (2020 census)
  - Total: 446,126
  - Density: 1,284.0/km^{2} (3,325.6/sq mi)
- Time zone: UTC+8 (China Standard)
- Website: www.fssc.gov.cn

Shuncheng District (simplified Chinese: 顺城区; traditional Chinese: 順城區; pinyin: Shùnchéng Qū) is one of the four districts under the administration of the city of Fushun, in Liaoning Province, China. It has a population of about 420,000, covering an area of 277 square kilometres (107 sq mi).

== Administrative Divisions ==
There are 5 subdistricts, 1 town and 2 townships in the district.

Five subdistricts are: Changchun Subdistrict (长春街道), Xinhua Subdistrict (新华街道), Fushuncheng Subdistrict (抚顺城街道), Jiangjunbao Subdistrict (将军堡街道), Gebu Subdistrict (葛布街道).

The only town is Qiandian (前甸镇).

Two townships are: Hebei Township (河北乡), Huiyuan Township (会元乡).
