= Wusheng Subdistrict =

Wusheng Subdistrict 武圣街道
- Subdistrict
- Location in Liaoning
- Coordinates: 41.2695°N 123.1826°E
- Country: People's Republic of China
- Province: Liaoning
- Prefecture-level city: Liaoyang
- District: Baita District
- Time zone: UTC+8 (China Standard)

Wusheng Subdistrict (simplified Chinese: 武圣街道; traditional Chinese: 武聖街道; pinyin: Jīngxī Jiēdào) is a subdistrict in Baita District, Liaoyang, Liaoning province, China. As of 2018, it has 3 residential communities under its administration.

== See also ==
- List of township-level divisions of Liaoning
