= Longwangmiao, Liaoning =

Longwangmiao 龙王庙镇
- Town
- Location in Liaoning
- Coordinates: 40°01′10″N 123°44′28″E
- Country: People's Republic of China
- Province: Liaoning
- Prefecture-level city: Dandong
- County-level city: Donggang
- Elevation: 9 m (30 ft)
- Time zone: UTC+8 (China Standard)

Longwangmiao (simplified Chinese: 龙王庙; traditional Chinese: 龍王廟; pinyin: Lóngwángmiào; lit. 'Dragon King temple') is a town of Donggang City in southeastern Liaoning province, China, 39 kilometres (24 mi) northwest of downtown Donggang and 20 km (12 mi) inland of Korea Bay. As of 2011, it has one residential community (社区) and 7 villages under its administration.

== See also ==
- List of township-level divisions of Liaoning
