= Gongnong, Guangyuan =

Gongnong 工农镇
- Town
- Location in Sichuan
- Coordinates: 32°29′2″N 105°51′2″E
- Country: People's Republic of China
- Province: Sichuan
- Prefecture-level city: Guangyuan
- District: Lizhou District
- Time zone: UTC+8 (China Standard)

Gongnong (Chinese: 工农; pinyin: Gōngnóng) is a town under the administration of Lizhou District, Guangyuan, Sichuan, China. As of 2018, it has 2 residential communities and 10 villages under its administration.
