= Gongnong Subdistrict, Luoyang =

Gongnong Subdistrict 工农街道
- Subdistrict
- Location in Henan
- Coordinates: 34°39′30″N 112°22′4″E
- Country: People's Republic of China
- Province: Henan
- Prefecture-level city: Luoyang
- District: Jianxi District
- Time zone: UTC+8 (China Standard)

Gongnong Subdistrict (Chinese: 工农街道; pinyin: Gōngnóng Jiēdào) is a subdistrict in Jianxi District, Luoyang, Henan province, China. As of 2018, it has 8 residential communities under its administration.

== See also ==
- List of township-level divisions of Henan
