= Gongnong Subdistrict, Liaoyang =

Subdistrict in China

Gongnong Subdistrict 工农街道
- Subdistrict
- Location in Liaoning
- Coordinates: 41°12′22″N 123°11′30″E
- Country: People's Republic of China
- Province: Liaoning
- Prefecture-level city: Liaoyang
- District: Hongwei District
- Time zone: UTC+8 (China Standard)

Gongnong Subdistrict (Chinese: 工农街道; pinyin: Gōngnóng Jiēdào) is a subdistrict in Hongwei District, Liaoyang, Liaoning province, China. As of 2018, it has 5 residential communities under its administration.

== See also ==
- List of township-level divisions of Liaoning
