= Zhanqian Subdistrict, Fushun =

Subdistrict of Fushun, Liaoning, China

Zhanqian Subdistrict (Chinese: 站前街道) is a subdistrict in Xinfu District, Fushun, Liaoning, China.
