= Gongnong Subdistrict, Deyang =

Gongnong Subdistrict 工农街道
- Subdistrict
- Location in Sichuan
- Coordinates: 31°5′46″N 104°22′44″E
- Country: People's Republic of China
- Province: Sichuan
- Prefecture-level city: Deyang
- District: Jingyang District
- Time zone: UTC+8 (China Standard)

Gongnong Subdistrict (Chinese: 工农街道; pinyin: Gōngnóng Jiēdào) is a subdistrict in Jingyang District, Deyang, Sichuan province, China. As of 2018, it has 19 residential communities and 2 villages under its administration.

== See also ==
- List of township-level divisions of Sichuan
