= Gongnong Subdistrict, Fushun =

Gongnong Subdistrict 工农街道
- Subdistrict
- Location in Liaoning
- Coordinates: 41°50′29″N 123°45′55″E
- Country: People's Republic of China
- Province: Liaoning
- Prefecture-level city: Fushun
- District: Wanghua District
- Time zone: UTC+8 (China Standard)

Gongnong Subdistrict (Chinese: 工农街道; pinyin: Gōngnóng Jiēdào) is a subdistrict in Wanghua District, Fushun, Liaoning province, China. As of 2018, it has 8 residential communities and 2 villages under its administration.

== See also ==
- List of township-level divisions of Liaoning
