= Taihe, Heishan County =

Taihe 太和镇
- Town
- Location in Liaoning
- Coordinates: 41°48′28″N 122°5′18″E
- Country: People's Republic of China
- Province: Liaoning
- Prefecture-level city: Jinzhou
- County: Heishan County
- Time zone: UTC+8 (China Standard)

Taihe (Chinese: 太和; pinyin: Tàihé) is a town under the administration of Heishan County, Liaoning, China. As of 2020, it has 17 villages under its administration:

- Taihe Village
- Gengtun Village (耿屯村)
- Baotun Village (包屯村)
- Liu'erjin Village (刘二金村)
- Xiqiu Village (西邱村)
- Daxie Village (大谢村)
- Xigong'ao Village (西公廒村)
- Dayugou Village (大菸沟村)
- Xiaoyushu Village (小榆树村)
- Shengli Village (胜利村)
- Baitaizi Village (白台子村)
- Wujian Village (五间村)
- Lanni Village (兰泥村)
- Ziqiang Village (自强村)
- Luojia Village (罗家村)
- Shaohu Village (稍户村)
- Jianshanzi Village (尖山子村)
