= Gongnong Subdistrict, Zhanjiang =

Gongnong Subdistrict 工农街道
- Subdistrict
- Location in Guangdong
- Coordinates: 21°11′34″N 110°23′56″E
- Country: People's Republic of China
- Province: Guangdong
- Prefecture-level city: Zhanjiang
- District: Xiashan District
- Time zone: UTC+8 (China Standard)

Gongnong Subdistrict (Chinese: 工农街道; pinyin: Gōngnóng Jiēdào) is a subdistrict in Xiashan District, Zhanjiang, Guangdong province, China. As of 2018, it has 4 residential communities and 2 villages under its administration.

== See also ==
- List of township-level divisions of Guangdong
