= Xinfu Subdistrict, Fushun =

Subdistrict of Fushun, Liaoning, China

Xinfu Subdistrict (Chinese: 新抚街道) is a subdistrict in Xinfu District, Fushun, Liaoning, China.
