= Xinfu District, Fushun =

Xinfu District 新抚区
- District
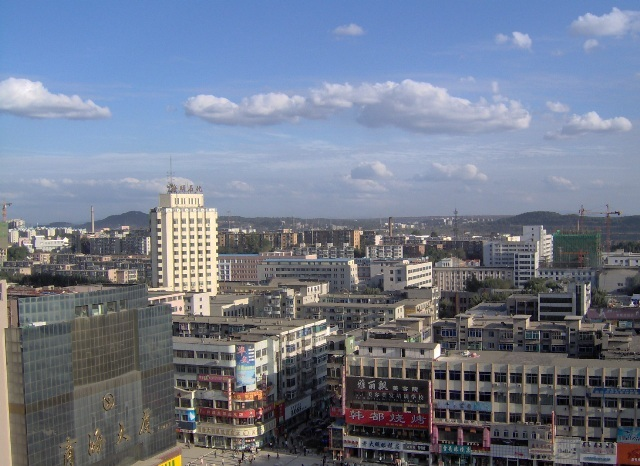

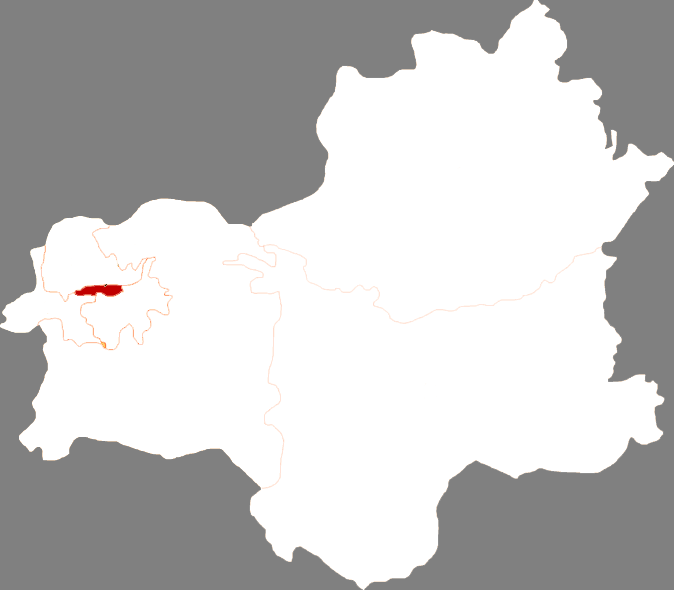
- Xinfu in Fushun

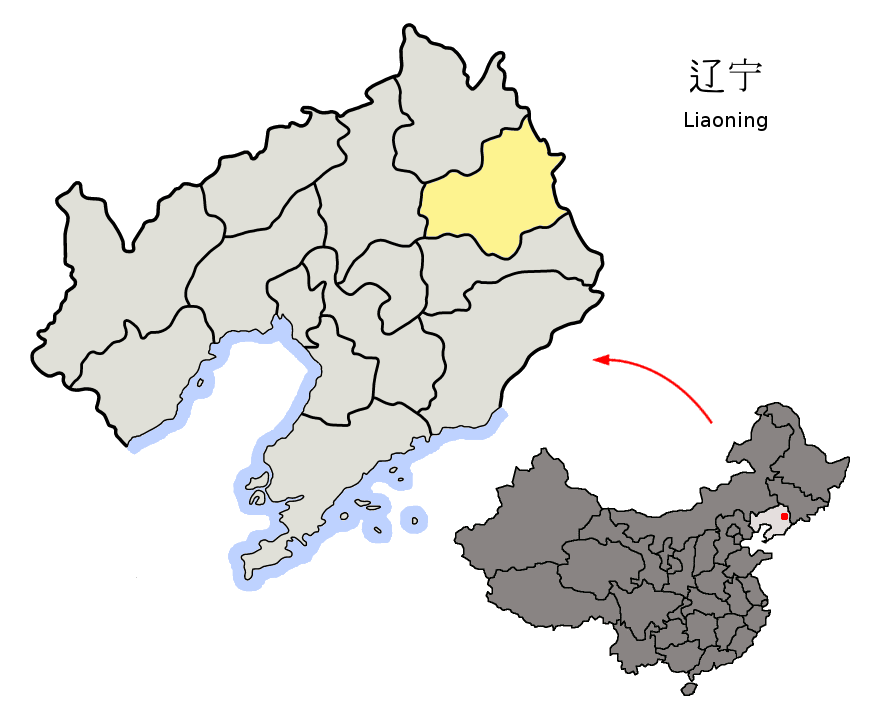
- Fushun in Liaoning
- Coordinates: 41°51′43″N 123°54′48″E
- Country: People's Republic of China
- Province: Liaoning
- Prefecture-level city: Fushun

Area
  - Total: 109.5 km^{2} (42.3 sq mi)

Population (2020 census)
  - Total: 222,984
  - Density: 2,036/km^{2} (5,274/sq mi)
- Time zone: UTC+8 (China Standard)

Xinfu District (simplified Chinese: 新抚区; traditional Chinese: 新撫區; pinyin: Xīnfǔ Qū), is one of the four districts under the administration of the city of Fushun, Liaoning Province, China. It has a population of about 222,984 in 2020, covering an area of 109.5 square kilometres (42.3 sq mi).

== Administrative divisions ==
There are six subdistricts within the district.

Subdistricts:

- Zhanqian Subdistrict (站前街道), Fumin Subdistrict (福民街道), Xinfu Subdistrict (新抚街道), Yong'antai Subdistrict (永安台街道), Donggongyuan Subdistrict (东公园街道), Yulin Subdistrict (榆林街道)
