= Xiangyang Subdistrict, Tieling =

Xiangyang Subdistrict 向阳街道
- Subdistrict
- Location in Liaoning
- Coordinates: 42°32′17″N 124°8′29″E
- Country: People's Republic of China
- Province: Liaoning
- Prefecture-level city: Tieling
- District: Qinghe District
- Time zone: UTC+8 (China Standard)

Xiangyang Subdistrict (Chinese: 向阳街道; pinyin: Xiàngyáng Jiēdào) is a subdistrict in Qinghe District, Tieling, Liaoning, China. As of 2018, it has five residential communities, one village, and one industrial park community under its administration.

== See also ==
- List of township-level divisions of Liaoning
