= Kaiyuan, Liaoning =

Kaiyuan 开原市 K'ai-yüan
- County-level city
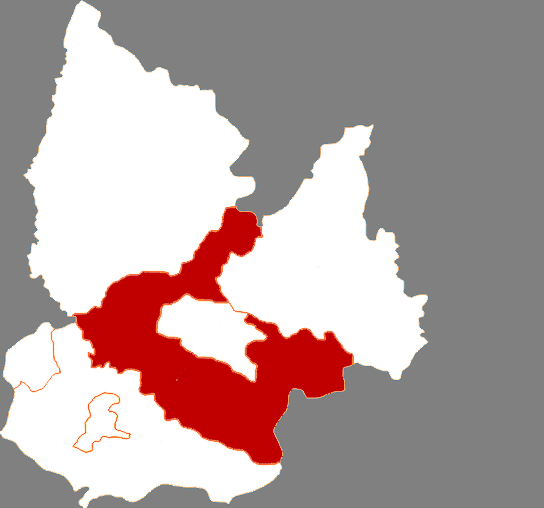
- Location in Tieling City

- Location of the city centre in Liaoning
- Coordinates: 42°32′46″N 124°02′17″E
- Country: People's Republic of China
- Province: Liaoning
- Prefecture-level city: Tieling

Area
  - County-level city: 2,813.3 km^{2} (1,086.2 sq mi)
  - Urban: 150.39 km^{2} (58.07 sq mi)

Population (2020)
  - County-level city: 460,927
  - Density: 163.84/km^{2} (424.34/sq mi)
  - Urban: 257,822
- Time zone: UTC+8 (China Standard)
- Postal code: 112300
- Area code: 0024

Kaiyuan (simplified Chinese: 开原; traditional Chinese: 開原; pinyin: Kāiyuán; lit. 'Open Plains') is a county-level city in the northeast of Liaoning, People's Republic of China, bordering Jilin for a small section to the north. It is under the administration of Tieling City, the centre of which lies 33 kilometres (21 mi) to the southwest.

== Administrative divisions ==
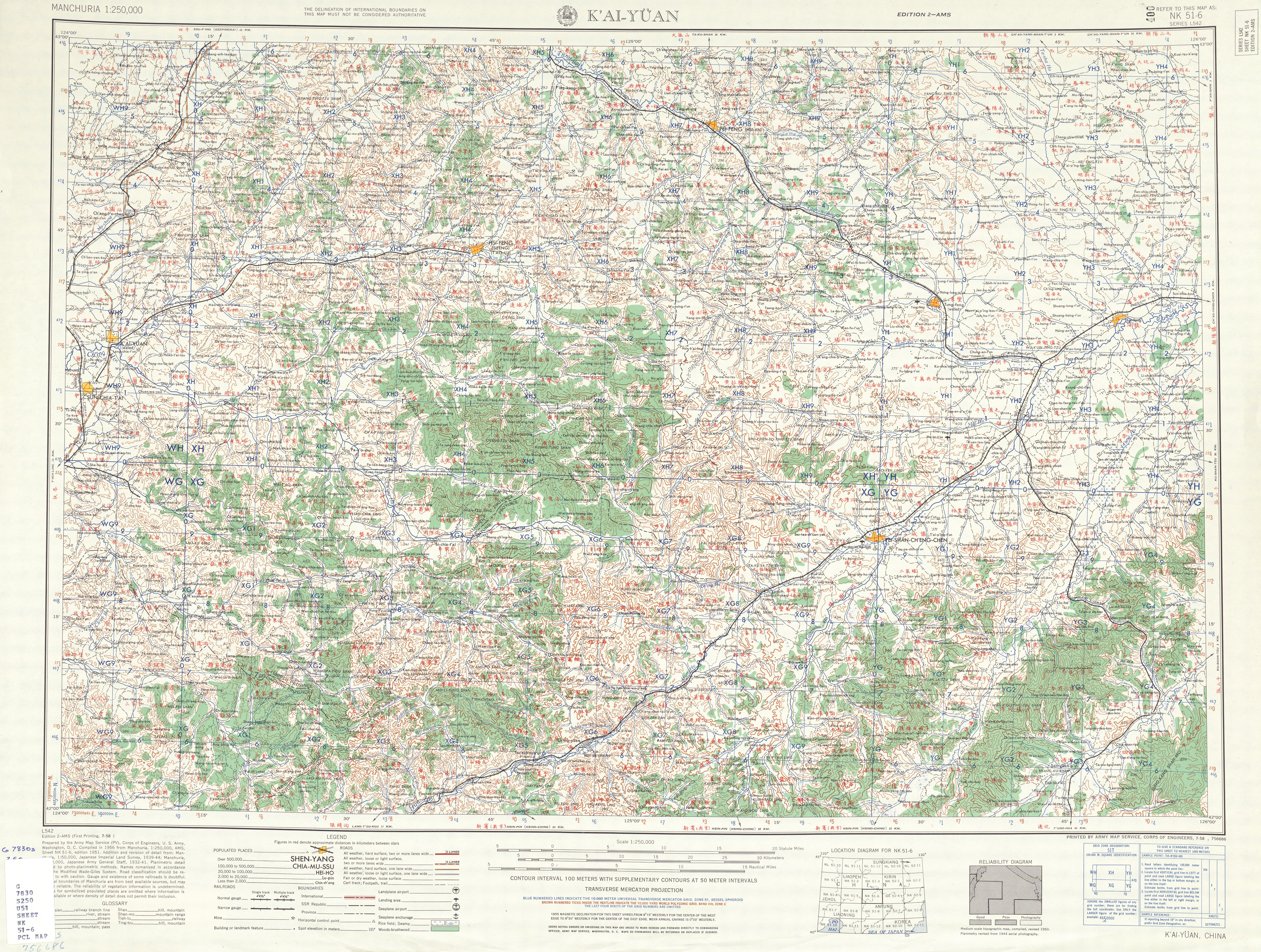
Map including Kaiyuan (labeled as 開原 K'AI-YÜAN (walled)) (AMS, 1956)

There are 3 subdistricts, 9 towns, and 9 townships under the city's administration.

Subdistricts:

- Xincheng Subdistrict (新城街道), Laocheng Subdistrict (老城街道), Xingkai Subdistrict (兴开街道)

Towns:

- Babao (八宝镇), Qingyunbao (庆云堡镇), Kaoshan (靠山镇), Yemin (业民镇), Jingouzi (金沟子镇), Zhonggu (中固镇), Bakeshu (八棵树镇), Lianhua (莲花镇), Weiyuanbao (威远堡镇)

Townships:

- Chengdong Township (城东乡), Sanjiazi Township (三家子乡), Songshanbao Township (松山堡乡), Majiazhai Township (马家寨乡), Lijiatai Township (李家台乡), Shangbadi Manchu Ethnic Township (上肥地满族乡), Xiabadi Manchu Ethnic Township (下肥地满族乡), Huangqizhai Manchu Ethnic Township (黄旗寨满族乡), Linfeng Manchu Ethnic Township (林丰满族乡)

== Geography and climate ==
Kaiyuan is situated in northeastern Liaoning in the southeastern part of Tieling City on the eastern bank of the middle reaches of the Liao River. It borders Dongfeng County and Qingyuan Manchu Autonomous County to the east, Tieling County to the south, Faku and Changtu counties to the west, and Lishu County (Jilin) to the north. Its administrative area reaches a maximal north–south extent of 86 km (53 mi) and east–west width of 89.4 km (55.6 mi). In the east, the land begins to transition to the foothills of the Changbai Mountains, while the west is marked by the Songliao Plain.

Kaiyuan has a monsoon-influenced humid continental climate (Köppen Dwa), characterised by hot, humid summers and long, cold and windy, but dry winters. The four seasons here are distinctive. A majority of the annual rainfall of 673 mm (26.5 in) occurs in July and August alone. The monthly 24-hour average temperature ranges from −13.4 °C (7.9 °F) in January to 23.9 °C (75.0 °F) in July, and the annual mean is 7.3 °C (45.1 °F).

Kaiyun was directly hit by tornadoes in 2019 and 2023.

Climate data for Kaiyuan, elevation 98 m (322 ft), (1991–2020 normals, extremes 1971–2010)
| Month | Jan | Feb | Mar | Apr | May | Jun | Jul | Aug | Sep | Oct | Nov | Dec | Year |
|---|---|---|---|---|---|---|---|---|---|---|---|---|---|
| Record high °C (°F) | 6.9 (44.4) | 17.6 (63.7) | 24.8 (76.6) | 30.6 (87.1) | 34.2 (93.6) | 37.1 (98.8) | 36.6 (97.9) | 35.8 (96.4) | 33.2 (91.8) | 28.5 (83.3) | 21.5 (70.7) | 13.3 (55.9) | 37.1 (98.8) |
| Mean daily maximum °C (°F) | −6.2 (20.8) | −1.1 (30.0) | 6.8 (44.2) | 16.7 (62.1) | 23.7 (74.7) | 27.6 (81.7) | 29.3 (84.7) | 28.3 (82.9) | 24.0 (75.2) | 15.7 (60.3) | 4.8 (40.6) | −3.9 (25.0) | 13.8 (56.9) |
| Daily mean °C (°F) | −13.1 (8.4) | −7.8 (18.0) | 0.8 (33.4) | 10.0 (50.0) | 17.3 (63.1) | 22.0 (71.6) | 24.4 (75.9) | 23.0 (73.4) | 17.0 (62.6) | 9.0 (48.2) | −0.9 (30.4) | −10.1 (13.8) | 7.6 (45.7) |
| Mean daily minimum °C (°F) | −19.0 (−2.2) | −13.9 (7.0) | −4.9 (23.2) | 3.5 (38.3) | 11.0 (51.8) | 16.6 (61.9) | 20.0 (68.0) | 18.4 (65.1) | 11.0 (51.8) | 3.1 (37.6) | −6.1 (21.0) | −15.5 (4.1) | 2.0 (35.6) |
| Record low °C (°F) | −37.9 (−36.2) | −33.9 (−29.0) | −22.8 (−9.0) | −11.7 (10.9) | −2.2 (28.0) | 5.0 (41.0) | 11.3 (52.3) | 5.5 (41.9) | −2.3 (27.9) | −11.0 (12.2) | −23.6 (−10.5) | −33.1 (−27.6) | −37.9 (−36.2) |
| Average precipitation mm (inches) | 5.3 (0.21) | 8.5 (0.33) | 14.8 (0.58) | 28.8 (1.13) | 61.1 (2.41) | 94.8 (3.73) | 180.7 (7.11) | 190.4 (7.50) | 48.5 (1.91) | 36.4 (1.43) | 21.9 (0.86) | 9.5 (0.37) | 700.7 (27.57) |
| Average precipitation days (≥ 0.1 mm) | 3.7 | 3.4 | 4.7 | 6.5 | 9.2 | 12.3 | 12.6 | 11.6 | 7.6 | 6.5 | 5.7 | 5.1 | 88.9 |
| Average snowy days | 4.8 | 4.7 | 4.7 | 1.5 | 0 | 0 | 0 | 0 | 0 | 0.8 | 4.4 | 6.4 | 27.3 |
| Average relative humidity (%) | 67 | 61 | 54 | 49 | 53 | 66 | 78 | 81 | 73 | 65 | 65 | 68 | 65 |
| Mean monthly sunshine hours | 184.6 | 199.9 | 237.2 | 237.9 | 265.3 | 248.5 | 222.3 | 227.1 | 242.7 | 214.1 | 169.9 | 162.6 | 2,612.1 |
| Percentage possible sunshine | 63 | 67 | 64 | 59 | 59 | 55 | 48 | 53 | 66 | 63 | 59 | 58 | 60 |
Source 1: China Meteorological Administration
Source 2: Weather China

== Notable people ==
- Sheng Shicai (1897–1970), a warlord who ruled Xinjiang from 1933 to 1944.
- Xiao Jie (1957), Chinese politician
- Zhao Benshan (1957), Chinese actor
- Xiaoshenyang (1981), Chinese actor
