= Chai River Reservoir =

Reservoir in Tieling County, Liaoning, China

- 柴河水库
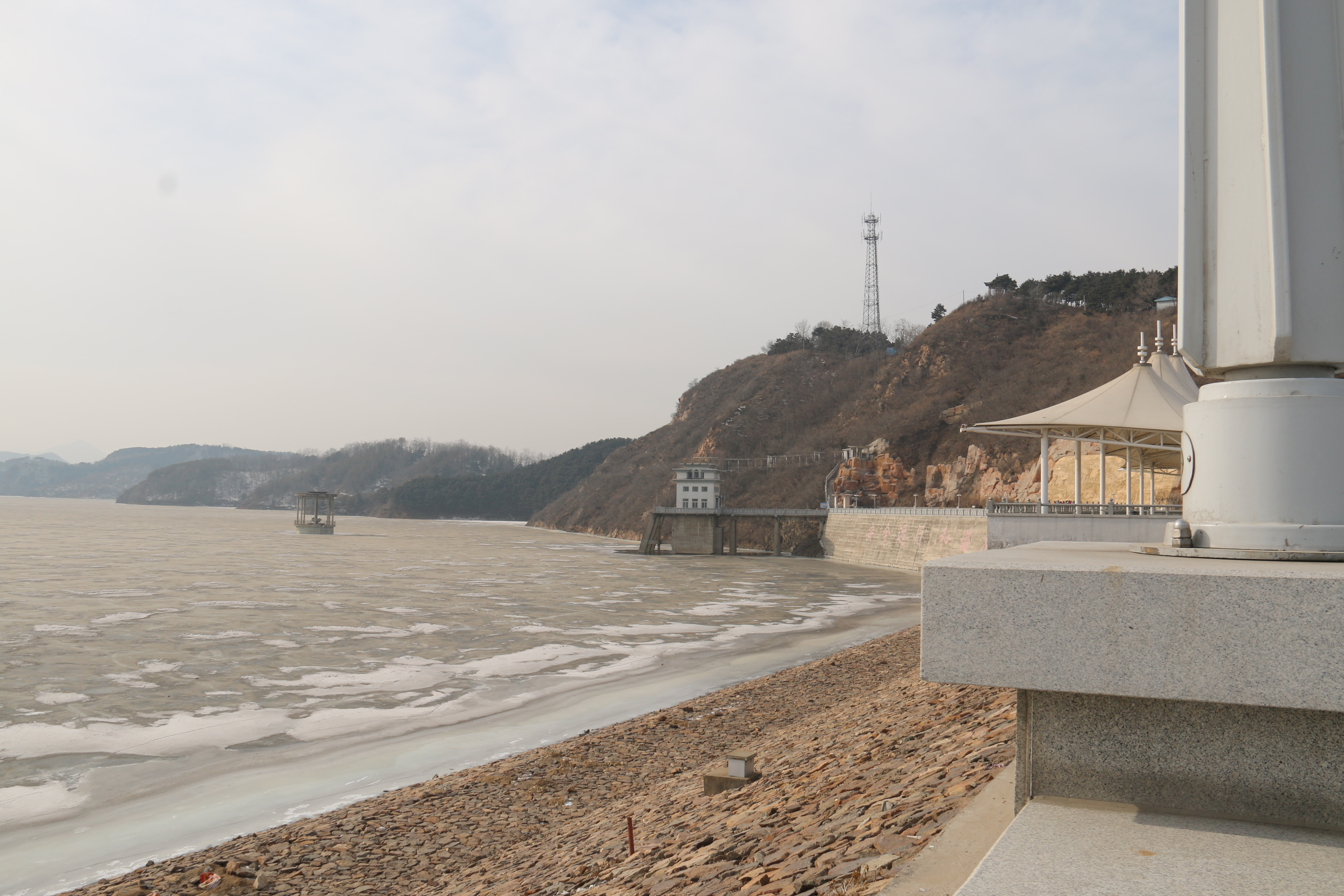

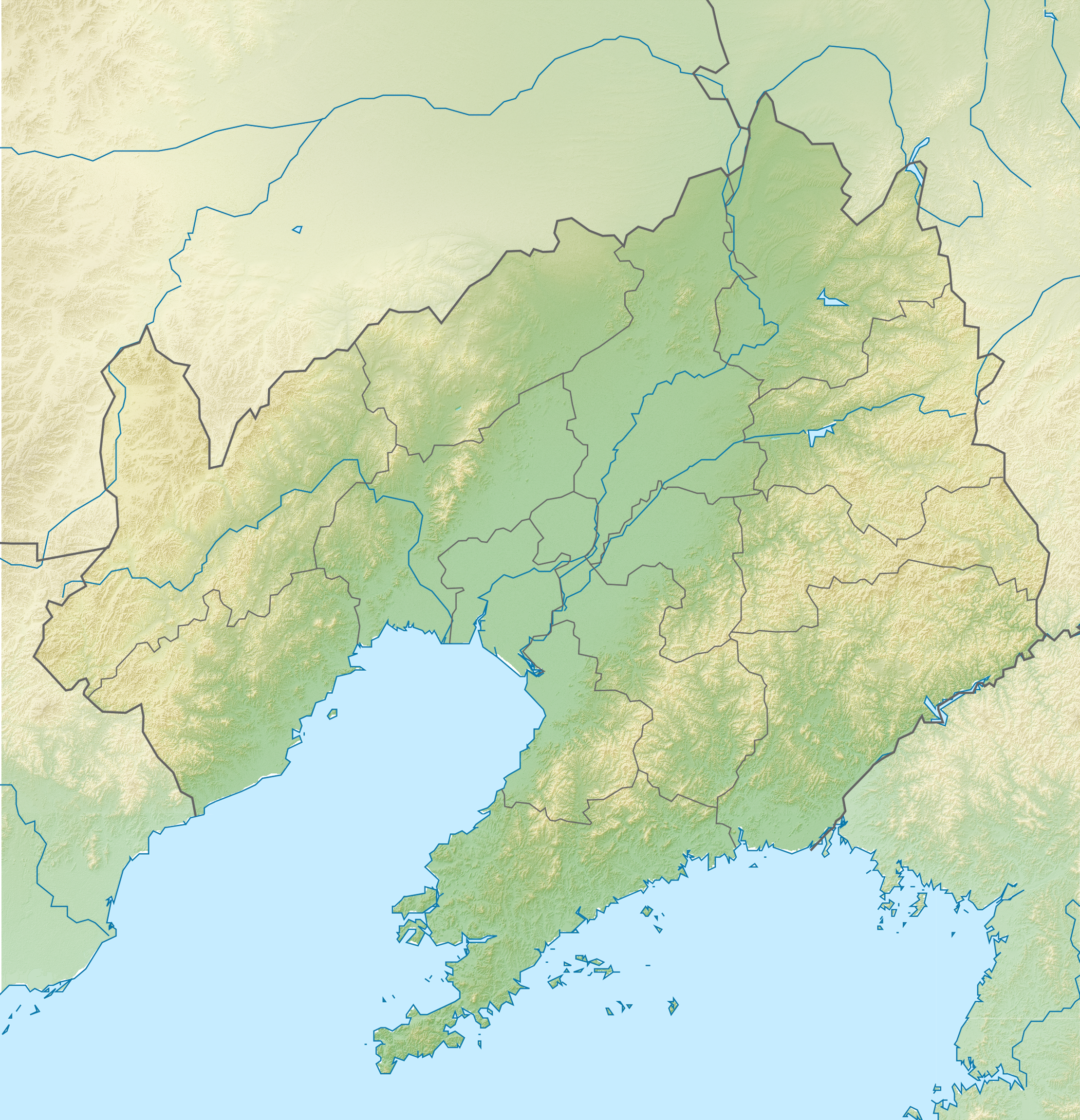
- Location within Liaoning
- Location: Tieling County, Tieling City, Liaoning Province, China
- Coordinates: 42.24°N 124.03°E
- Primary inflows: Chai River (a branch of Liao River)
- Built: 1972
- Water volume: 636,000,000 cubic metres (2.25×10^{10} cu ft)
- Settlements: Tieling

Chai River Reservoir (Chinese: 柴河水库; pinyin: Chaihe Shuiku) is a Large Type II reservoir located in Tieling County. Currently it serves as a drinking water source of Yinzhou District, Tieling and other adjacent areas.
