= Yinzhou District, Tieling =

Yinzhou 银州区
- District
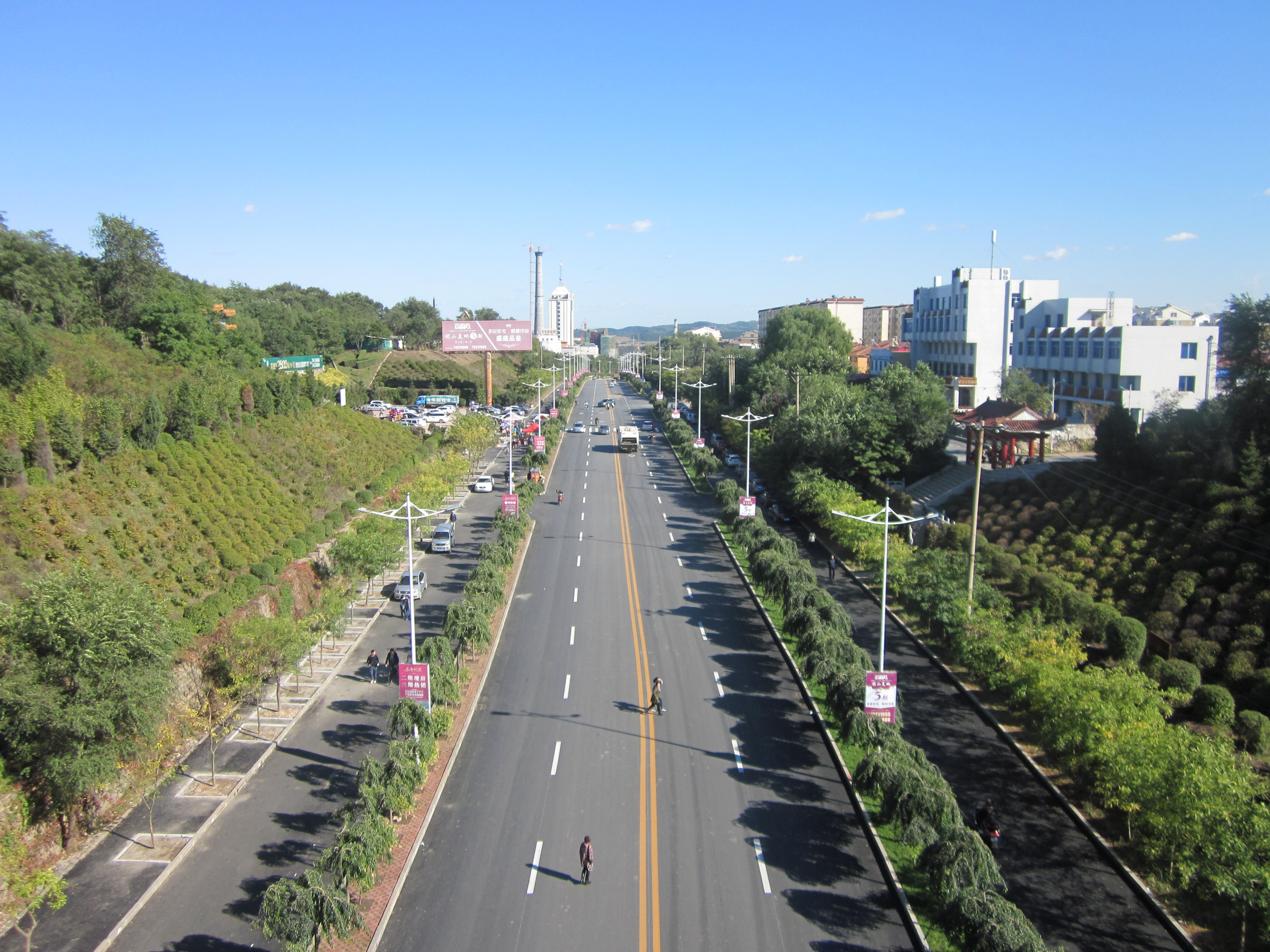

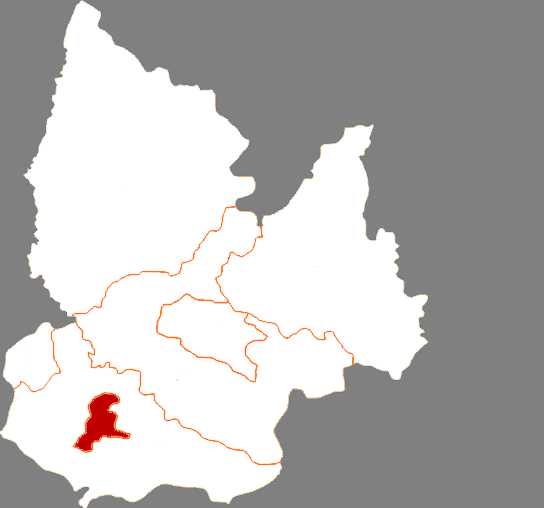
- Location in Tieling
- Coordinates: 42°17′35″N 123°51′48″E
- Country: China
- Province: Liaoning
- Prefecture-level city: Tieling

Area
  - Total: 203 km^{2} (78 sq mi)

Population (2020 census)
  - Total: 375,292
  - Density: 1,850/km^{2} (4,790/sq mi)
- Time zone: UTC+8 (China Standard)
- Website: www.tlyz.gov.cn

Yinzhou District (simplified Chinese: 银州区; traditional Chinese: 銀州區; pinyin: Yínzhōu Qū; lit. 'Silver State') is an urban district of Tieling City, Liaoning province, China.

== Administrative divisions ==
There are seven subdistricts, one township and one economic development zone within the district:

- Hongqi Subdistrict (红旗街道)
- Gongren Subdistrict (工人街道)
- Tongzhong Subdistrict (铜钟街道)
- Chaihe Subdistrict (柴河街道)
- Tiedong Subdistrict (岭东街道)
- Tiexi Subdistrict (铁西街道)
- Liaohai Subdistrict (辽海街道)
- Longshan Township (龙山乡)
- Tieling Economic Development Zone (铁岭经济开发区)

== Sightseeings ==
- Longshou Mountain Scenic Area
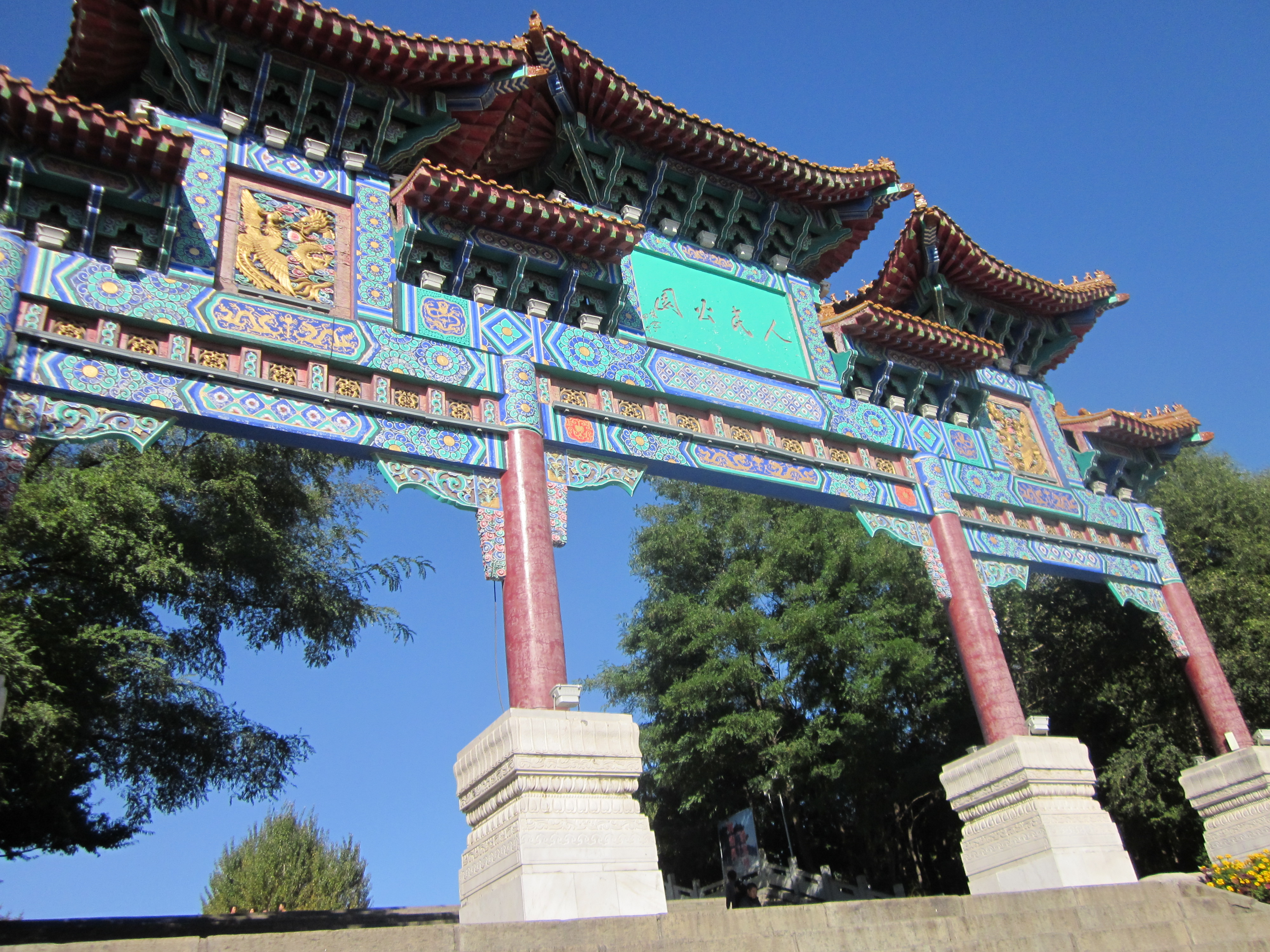
  Main Entrance of the Longshou Mountain Scenic Area
- Chai River Reservoir

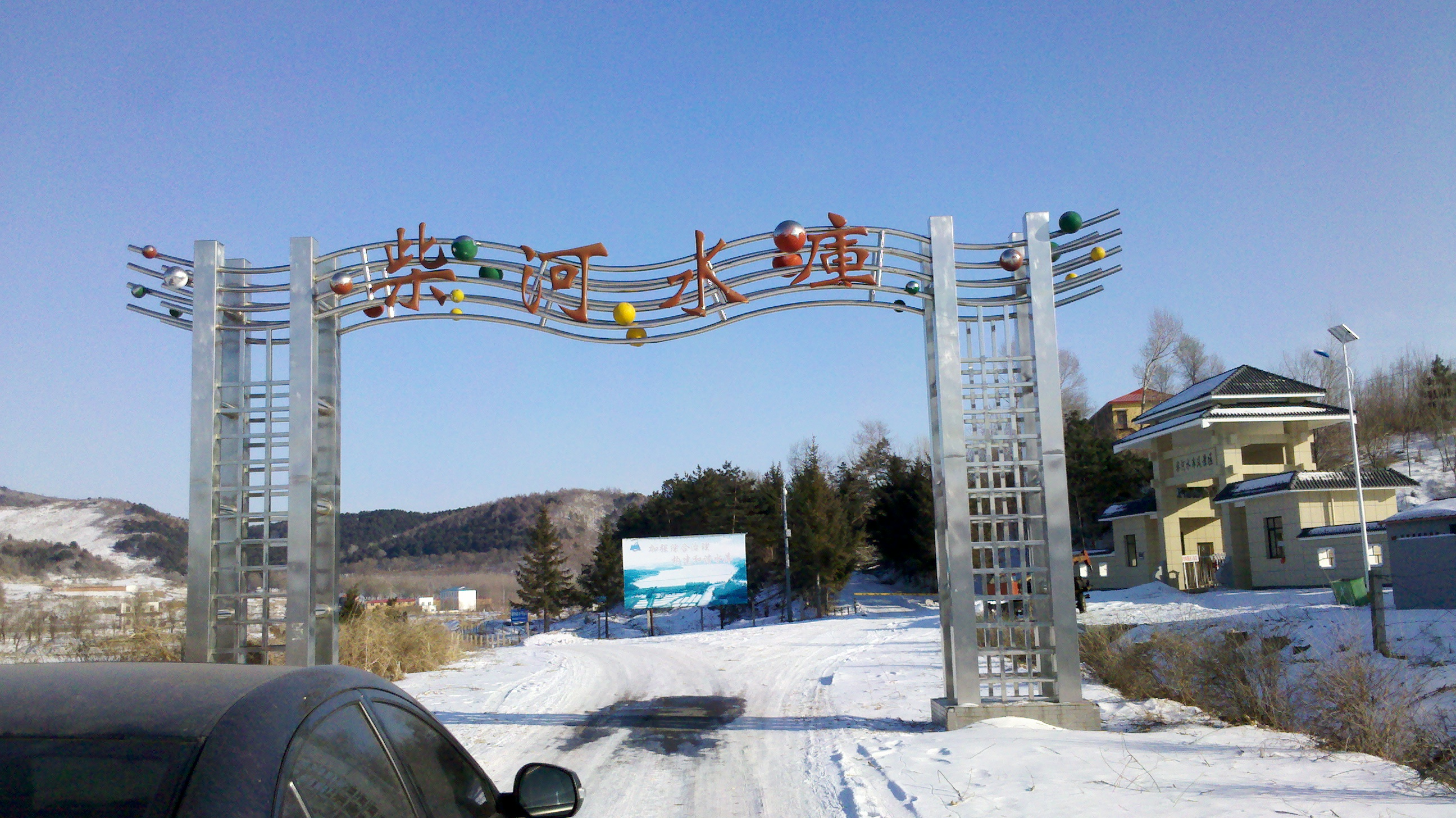
Chai River Reservoir main entrance

== Education ==
- No.3 Junior High School of Tieling City
- No.2 Senior High School of Tieling City
- No.4 Senior High School of Tieling City
