= Tieling =

Tieling 铁岭市 T'ieh-ling
- Prefecture-level city
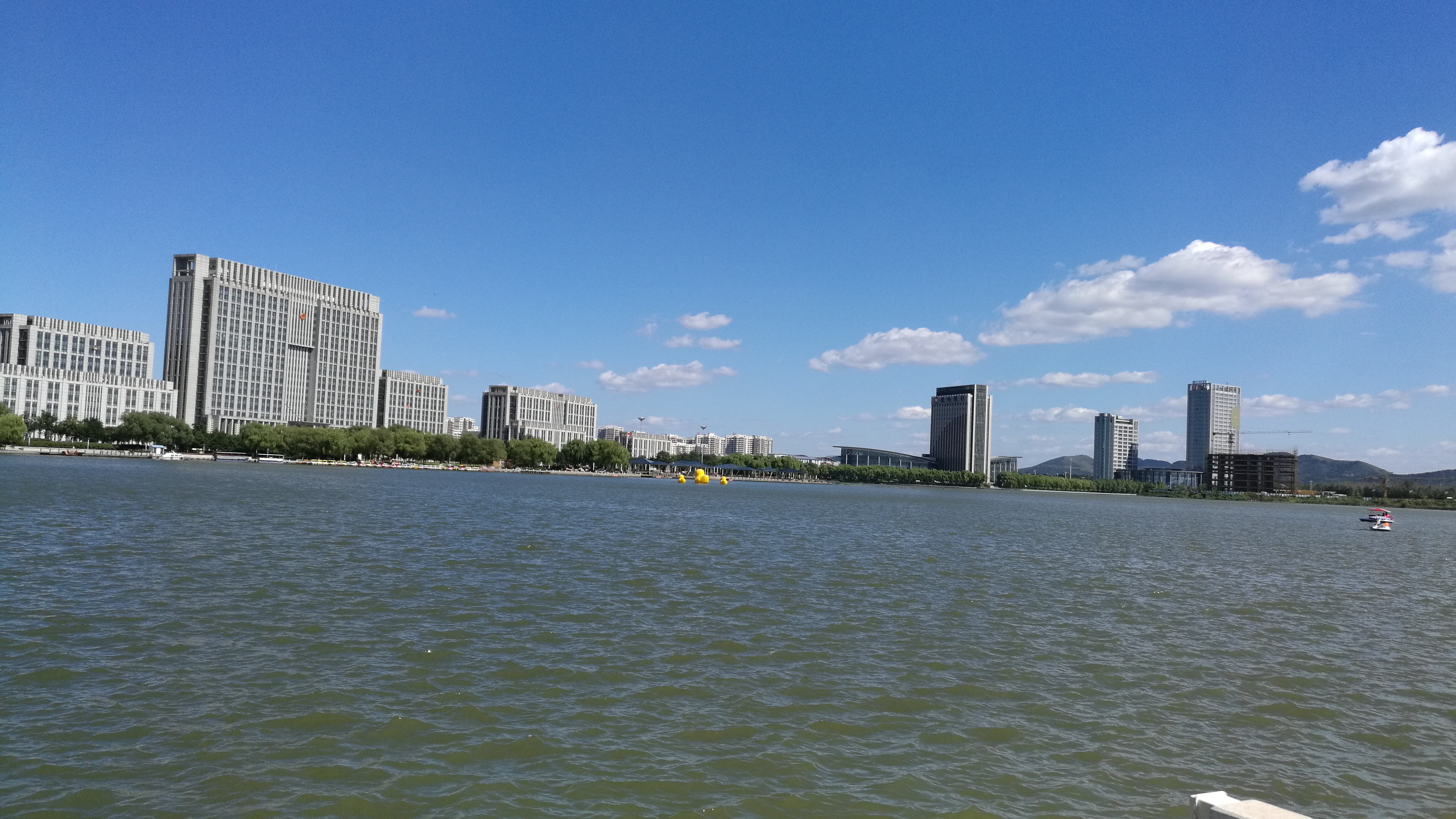
- The Tieling City Government Building with Ruyi Lake

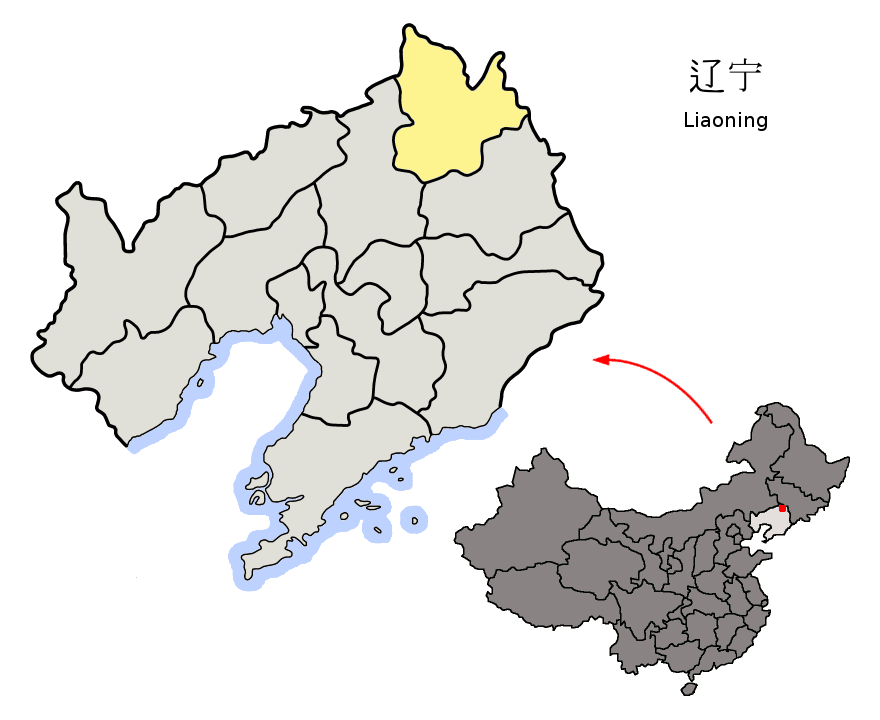
- Location of Tieling City jurisdiction in Liaoning

- Location of the city centre in Liaoning
- Coordinates (Yinzhou District government): 42°17′12″N 123°50′33″E
- Country: People's Republic of China
- Province: Liaoning
- Municipal seat: Tieling County
- Districts and Counties: List: Yinzhou District; Qinghe District; Diaobingshan City; Kaiyuan City; Tieling County; Xifeng County; Changtu County

Government
  - CPC Secretary: Wu Yesong
  - Mayor: Sun Yi

Area
  - Prefecture-level city: 12,966 km^{2} (5,006 sq mi)
  - Urban: 638 km^{2} (246 sq mi)
  - Metro: 2,434 km^{2} (940 sq mi)

Population (2020 census)
  - Prefecture-level city: 2,388,294
  - Density: 184.20/km^{2} (477.07/sq mi)
  - Urban: 459,985
  - Urban density: 721/km^{2} (1,870/sq mi)
  - Metro: 699,675
  - Metro density: 287.5/km^{2} (744.5/sq mi)

GDP
  - Prefecture-level city: CN¥ 74 billion US$ 11.9 billion
  - Per capita: CN¥ 27,885; US$ 4,477
- Time zone: UTC+8 (China Standard)
- Postal code: 112000
- Area code: 24
- ISO 3166 code: CN-LN-12
- Licence plates: 辽M
- Administrative division code: 211200
- Website: www.tieling.gov.cn

Tieling (Chinese: 铁岭; pinyin: Tiělǐng) is one of 14 prefecture-level cities in Liaoning province of the People's Republic of China. Tieling is a city where coal mining is an important industry.

== Demographics ==
As of the 2020 census, Tieling was home to 2,388,294 people, whom 699,675 lived in the built-up (or metro) area made of Yinzhou District and Tieling County, Qinghe District not being conurbated yet. Tieling is a multiethnic area where the majority is Han and the minorities, like the Manchu, Korean, Mongolian, Hui, Xibo, Uygur, and ethnic Russians, live in a compact community. The minorities make up 23.2% of the total population.

== Administrative divisions ==
Tieling has jurisdiction over 7 divisions:

Map
Name	Hanzi	Hanyu Pinyin	Population (2003 est.)	Area (km^{2})	Density (/km^{2})
Yinzhou District	银州区	Yínzhōu Qū	340,000	203	1,675
Qinghe District	清河区	Qīnghé Qū	100,000	423	236
Diaobingshan City	调兵山市	Diàobīngshān Shì	240,000	263	913
Kaiyuan City	开原市	Kāiyuán Shì	580,000	2,825	205
Tieling County	铁岭县	Tiělǐng Xiàn	380,000	2,231	170
Xifeng County	西丰县	Xīfēng Xiàn	350,000	2,699	130
Changtu County	昌图县	Chāngtú Xiàn	1,030,000	4,322	238

== Climate ==
Climate data for Tieling, elevation 85 m (279 ft), (1991–2020 normals, extremes 1981–2025)
Month	Jan	Feb	Mar	Apr	May	Jun	Jul	Aug	Sep	Oct	Nov	Dec	Year
Record high °C (°F)	8.0 (46.4)	17.5 (63.5)	24.8 (76.6)	29.8 (85.6)	34.0 (93.2)	37.6 (99.7)	37.6 (99.7)	35.6 (96.1)	33.3 (91.9)	29.2 (84.6)	22.1 (71.8)	13.6 (56.5)	37.6 (99.7)
Mean daily maximum °C (°F)	−5.6 (21.9)	−0.5 (31.1)	7.1 (44.8)	16.8 (62.2)	23.8 (74.8)	27.8 (82.0)	29.5 (85.1)	28.5 (83.3)	24.3 (75.7)	16.1 (61.0)	5.3 (41.5)	−3.2 (26.2)	14.2 (57.5)
Daily mean °C (°F)	−11.7 (10.9)	−6.5 (20.3)	1.5 (34.7)	10.7 (51.3)	17.7 (63.9)	22.3 (72.1)	24.7 (76.5)	23.4 (74.1)	17.9 (64.2)	9.9 (49.8)	0.1 (32.2)	−8.6 (16.5)	8.5 (47.2)
Mean daily minimum °C (°F)	−16.8 (1.8)	−11.9 (10.6)	−3.7 (25.3)	4.8 (40.6)	11.8 (53.2)	17.1 (62.8)	20.6 (69.1)	19.2 (66.6)	12.4 (54.3)	4.6 (40.3)	−4.5 (23.9)	−13.2 (8.2)	3.4 (38.1)
Record low °C (°F)	−34.6 (−30.3)	−29.0 (−20.2)	−18.2 (−0.8)	−7.8 (18.0)	0.7 (33.3)	5.4 (41.7)	11.5 (52.7)	7.6 (45.7)	0.1 (32.2)	−8.8 (16.2)	−20.8 (−5.4)	−30.0 (−22.0)	−34.6 (−30.3)
Average precipitation mm (inches)	5.3 (0.21)	7.8 (0.31)	15.0 (0.59)	32.1 (1.26)	60.3 (2.37)	90.6 (3.57)	175.1 (6.89)	163.7 (6.44)	52.6 (2.07)	38.0 (1.50)	20.7 (0.81)	10.5 (0.41)	671.7 (26.43)
Average precipitation days (≥ 0.1 mm)	3.6	3.2	4.7	6.8	9.5	12.0	12.4	11.4	7.2	6.8	5.8	4.8	88.2
Average snowy days	5.0	4.2	4.5	1.4	0	0	0	0.2	0.1	0.8	4.5	6.5	27.2
Average relative humidity (%)	60	53	48	46	51	65	76	79	69	61	60	62	61
Mean monthly sunshine hours	188.4	200.4	237.7	234.8	264.6	239.7	212.5	216.9	239.5	212.3	172.3	164.5	2,583.6
Percentage possible sunshine	64	67	64	58	58	53	46	51	65	63	59	58	59
Source: China Meteorological Administration

== Notable people ==
The famous Chinese skit and sitcom actor, director, and entrepreneur Zhao Benshan was born in Tieling. Chinese director Zhang Meng was born in Tieling.

== Sightseeing ==
There are several sightseeing spots:

- Yingang Academy (银冈书院)
- Longshou Mountain Mountain Scenic Area (龙首山风景区)
- Chai River Reservoir (柴河水库)
- Shangyang Lake Dam (an AAAA Level Sightseeing spot in Qinghe District, Tieling, also called Qinghe Dam (尚阳湖水库，清河水库)
- Liao River Museum (In Lotus Lake Wetland Park) (辽河博物馆)
- Lotus Lake Wetland Park (in Fanhe Town, Tieling)(莲花湖湿地公园)
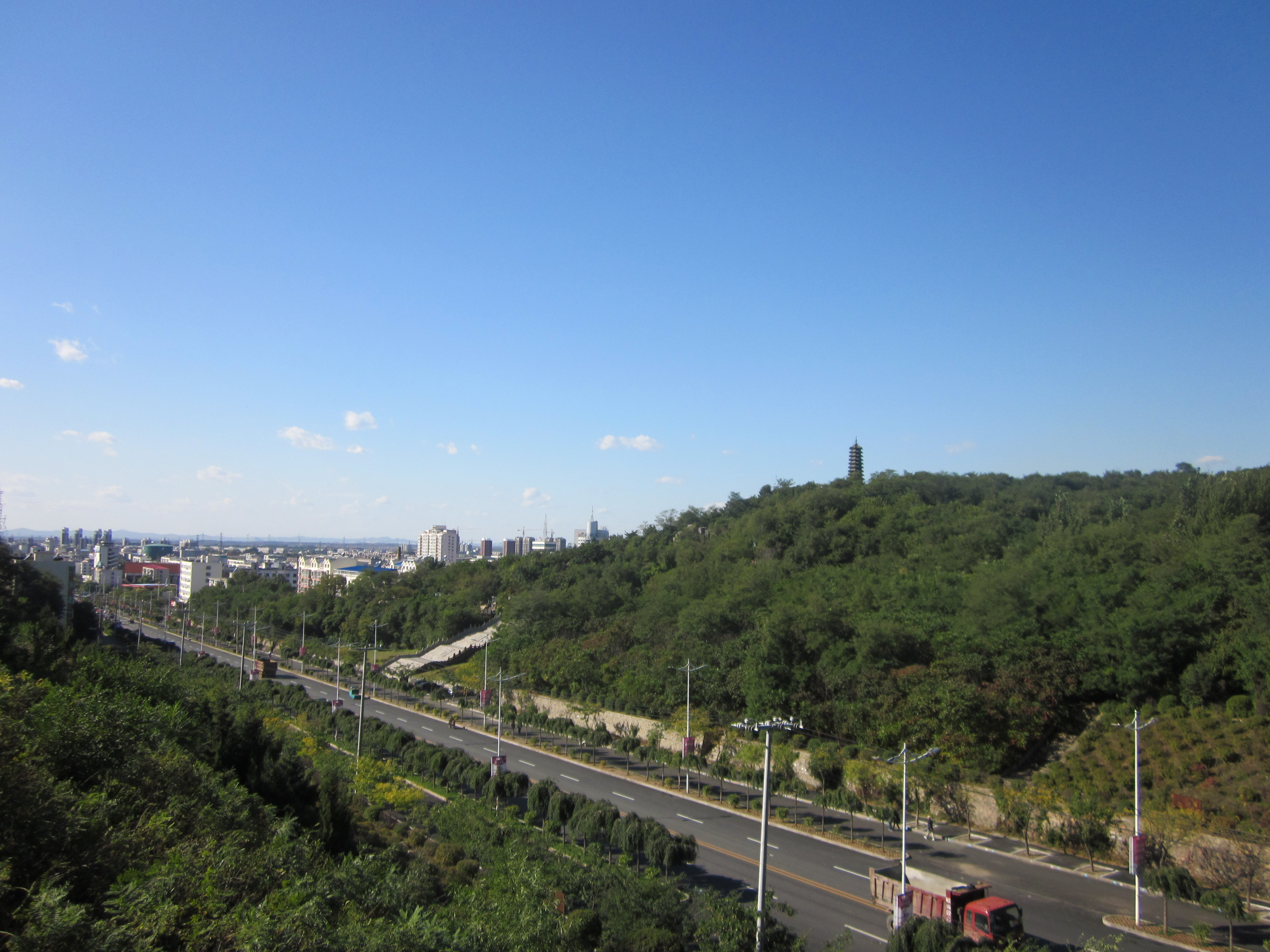
Longshou Mountain Scenic Area

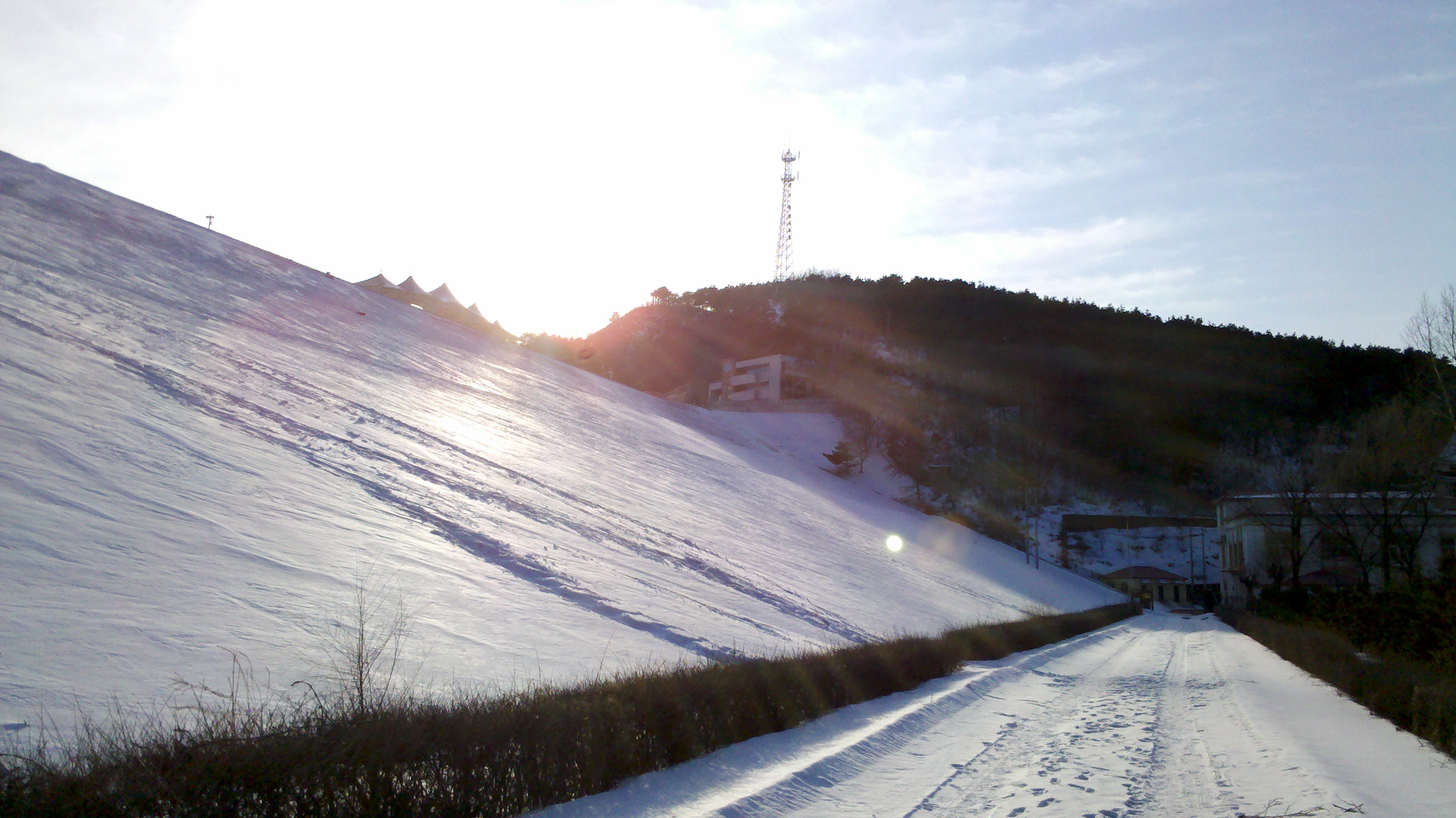
Chai River Reservoir

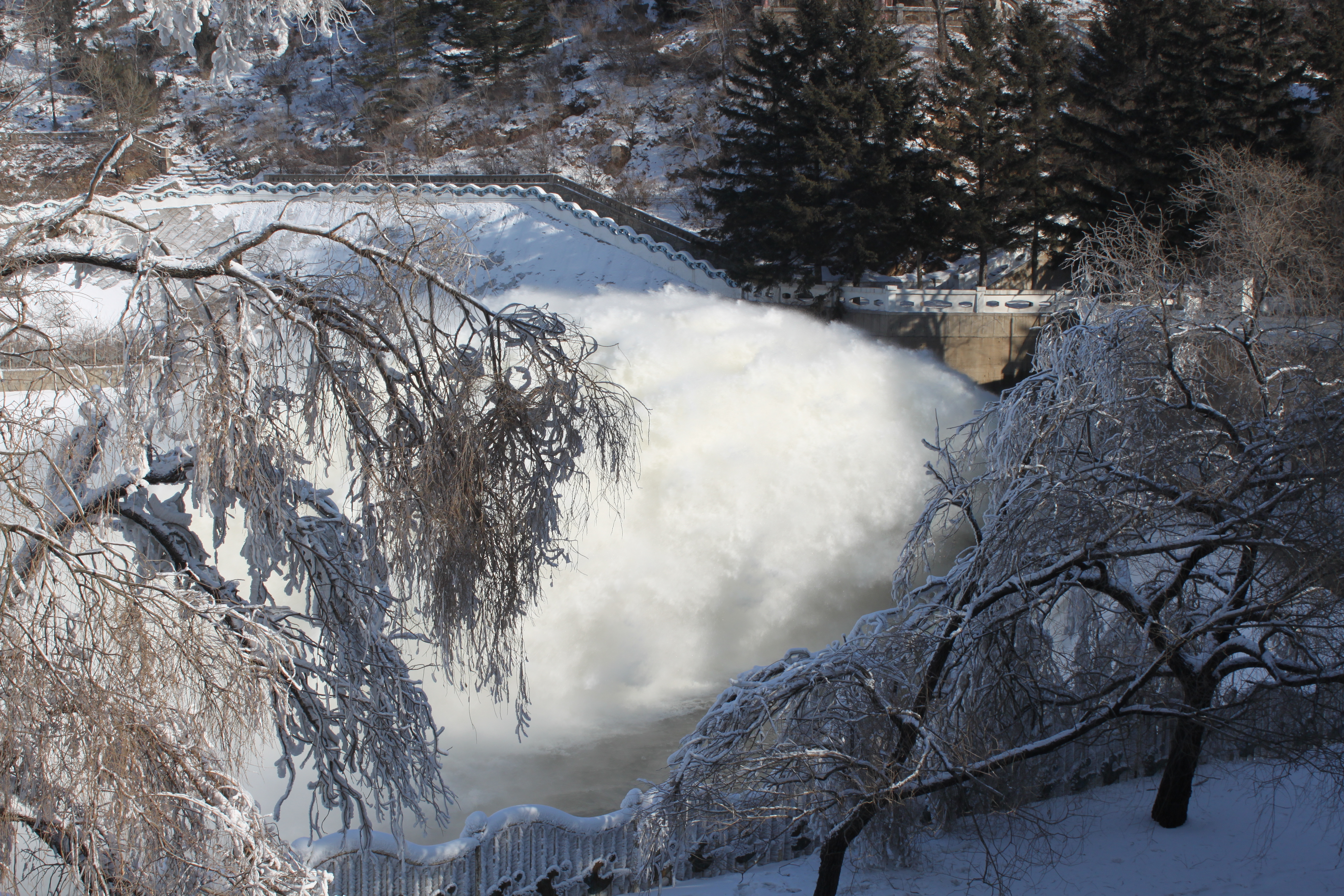
Qinghe Reservoir

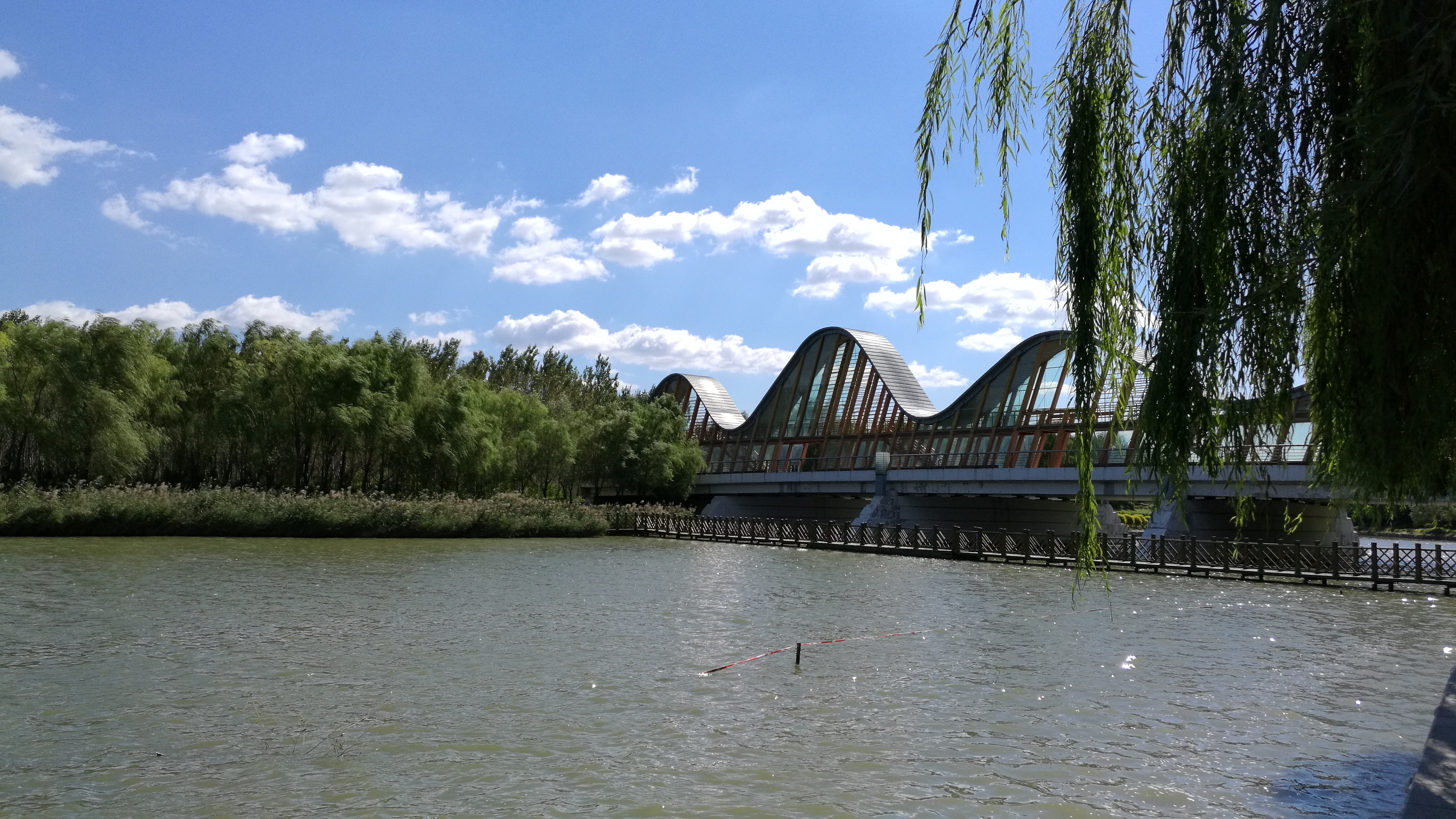
Ruyi Lake

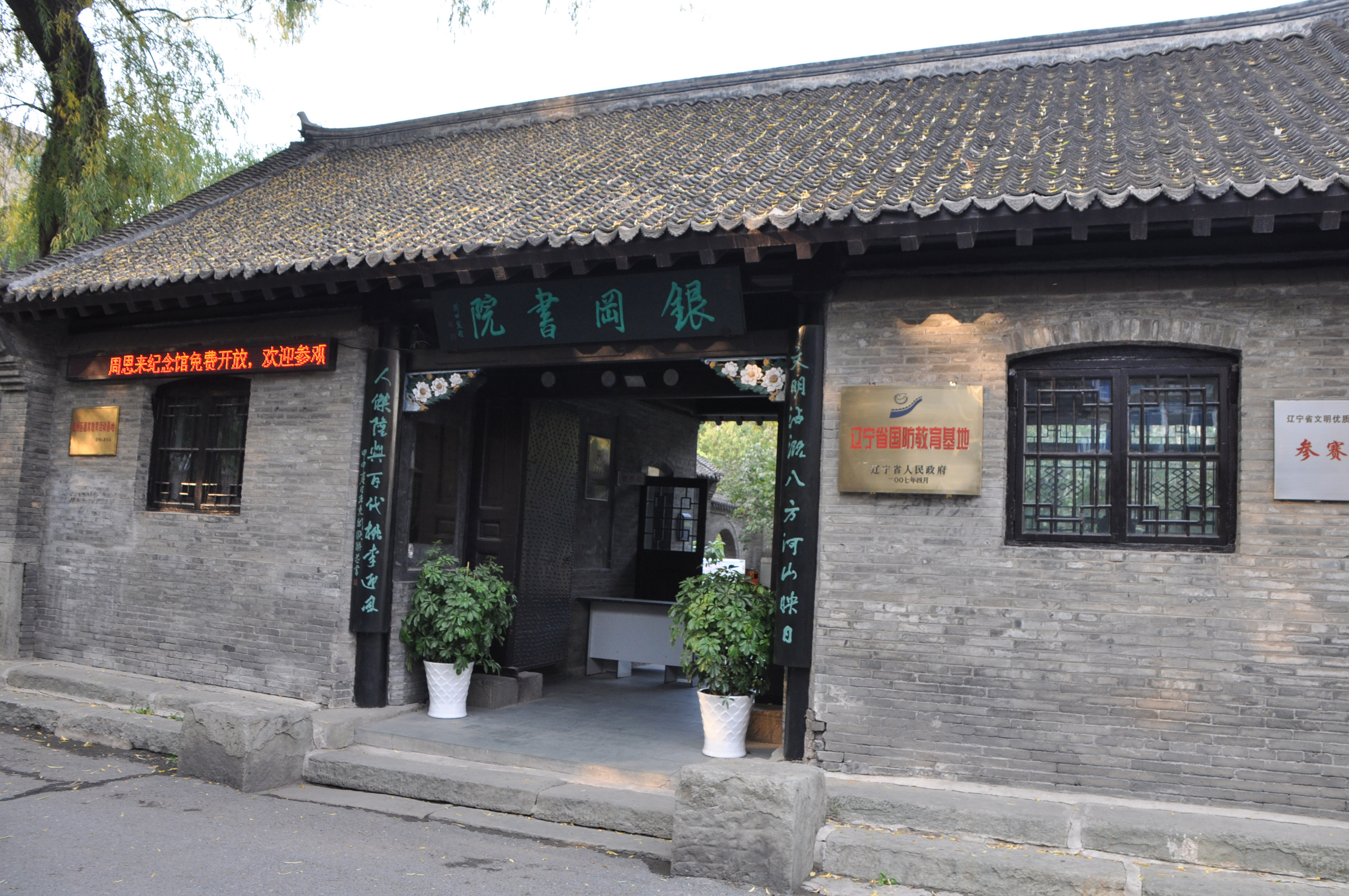
Yingang Academy

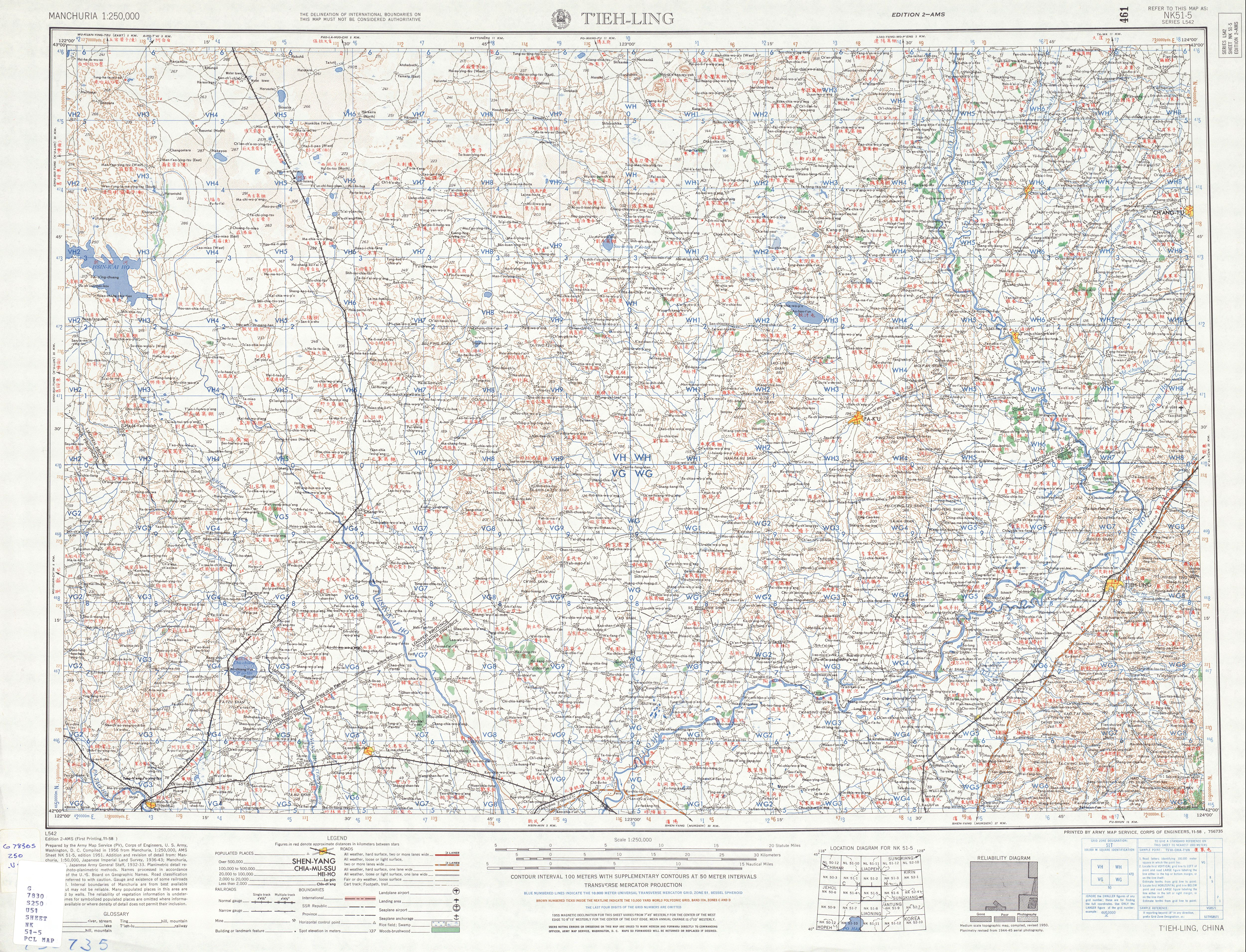
Map including Tieling (labeled as 鉄嶺 T'IEH-LING) (AMS, 1956)

== Economy ==
Tieling has abundant precious metal and mineral resources, including gold, silver, and aluminum.

== Transportation ==
=== Rail ===
- Harbin–Dalian high-speed railway
- Beijing–Harbin railway

=== Road ===
- China National Highways 102

== International relations ==
=== Sister cities ===
- Kanuma, Japan 1980
