= Tieling High School =

- 铁岭高中
- Tieling High School
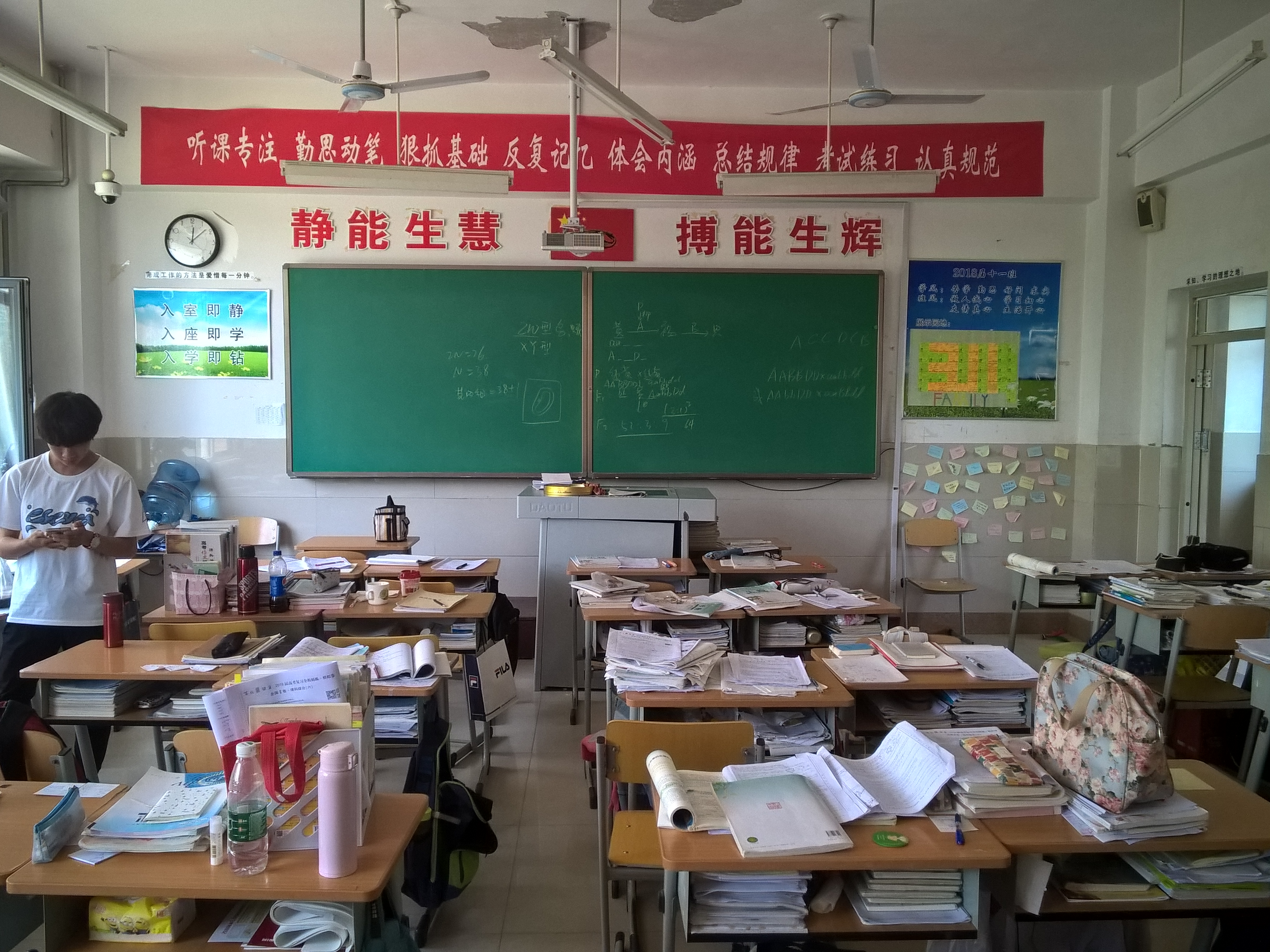

Location
- Hengshan Road 45, Fanhe Town; Tieling, Liaoning, 112000; China; 42°13′56″N 123°42′48″E

Information
- Former names: 铁岭市第一高级中学；一高
- School type: Public
- Motto: 爱国爱校，尊敬师长；严守纪律，努力成才
- Headmaster: Gao Hui
- Teaching staff: 308
- Grades: 10-12
- Years offered: 3
- Age range: 14-18
- Average class size: 55
- Language: Mandarin

Tieling High School (or Tieling Senior Middle School) (Chinese: 铁岭高中; pinyin: Tiělǐng Gāozhōng) is a senior high school located in Fanhe Town, Tieling. It currently has a faculty number of 238 and enrolls approx. 1000 students annually. Situated in the west of Fanhe, it's surrounded by several real estate developments and Tieling Experimental School.
