= Fanhe Town, Tieling =

Fanhe Town 凡河镇
- Town
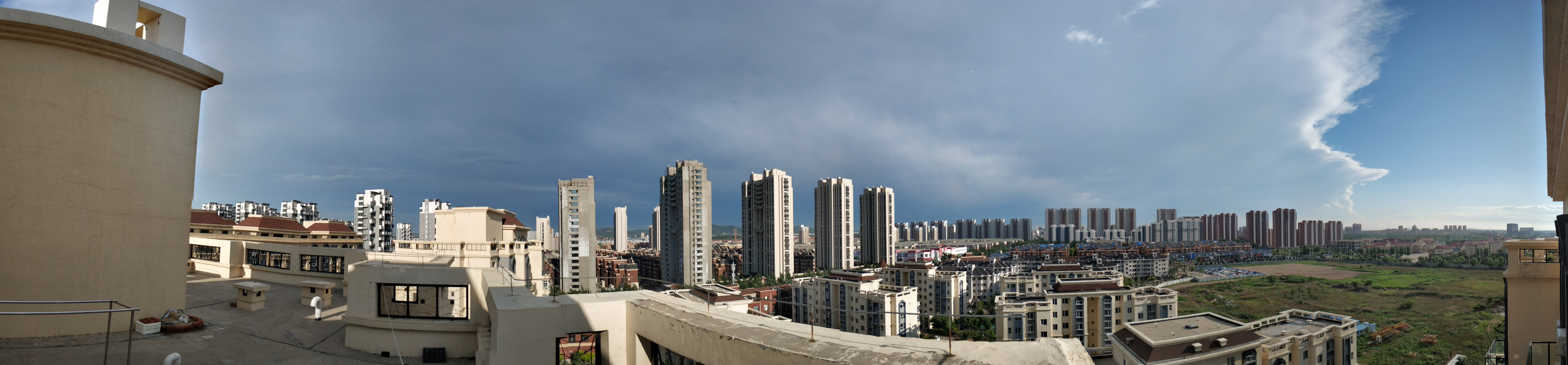
- Panoramical view of the town

- Location in Liaoning
- Coordinates: 42.22442°N 123.76994°E
- Town: People's Republic of China
- Province: Liaoning
- Prefecture-level city: Tieling
- Elevation: 58 m (190 ft)
- Time zone: UTC+8 (China Standard)

Fanhe Town (also called Tieling New City, Fanhe New District, Tieling New District) is a recently developed town in Tieling County, China, where the buildings of the government of Tieling City are located in.

== Sightseeing ==
Lotus Lake Wetland Park

== Education ==
Tieling High School
