= Qinghe Reservoir =

Reservoir in Liaoning, China

Qinghe Reservoir; Qing River Reservoir
- 清河水库
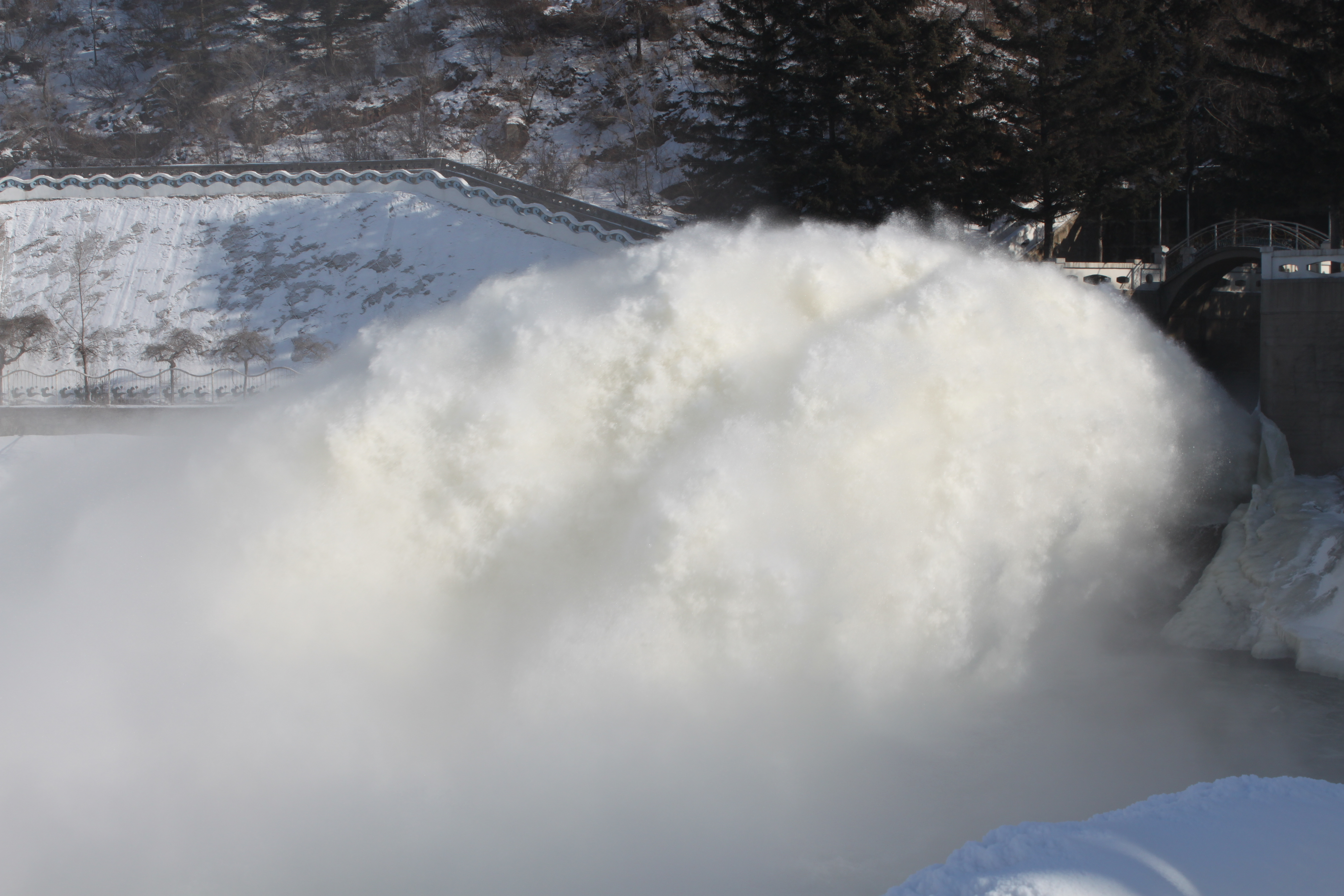

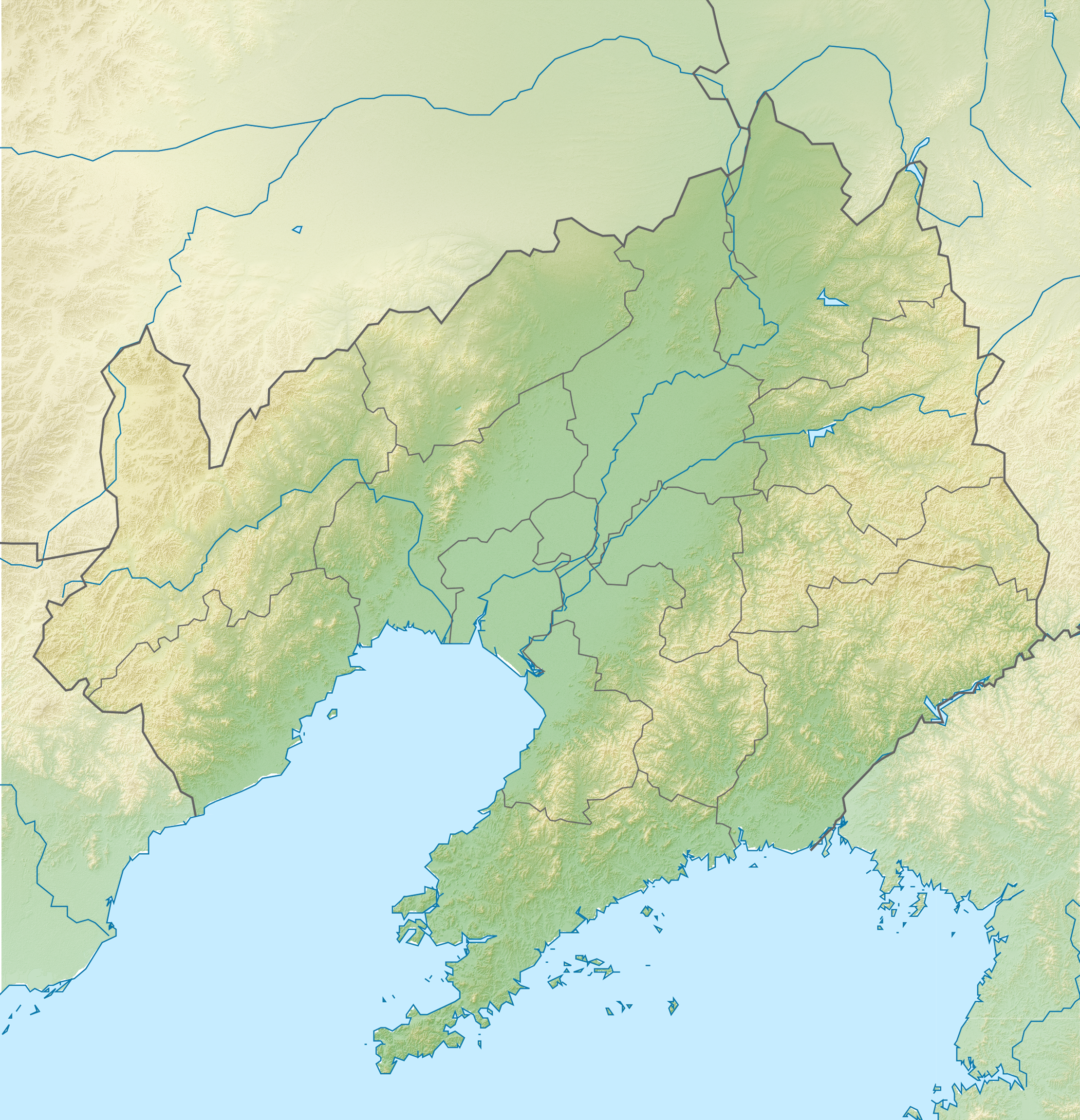
- Location within Liaoning Location within China
- Location: Qinghe District, Tieling
- Coordinates: 42°31′15″N 124°16′25″E
- Primary inflows: Qing River (a branch of Liao River)
- Built: 1952-1958
- Surface area: 54 square kilometres (21 sq mi)
- Water volume: 917,000,000 cubic metres (3.24×10^{10} cu ft)
- Settlements: Tieling

Qinghe Reservoir (Chinese: 清河水库; pinyin: Qīnghé Shuǐkù) is a Large Type II reservoir in Qinghe District, Tieling, Liaoning, China.
