= Qinghe District, Tieling =

Coordinates: 42°32′48″N 124°09′33″E

Qinghe 清河区
- District
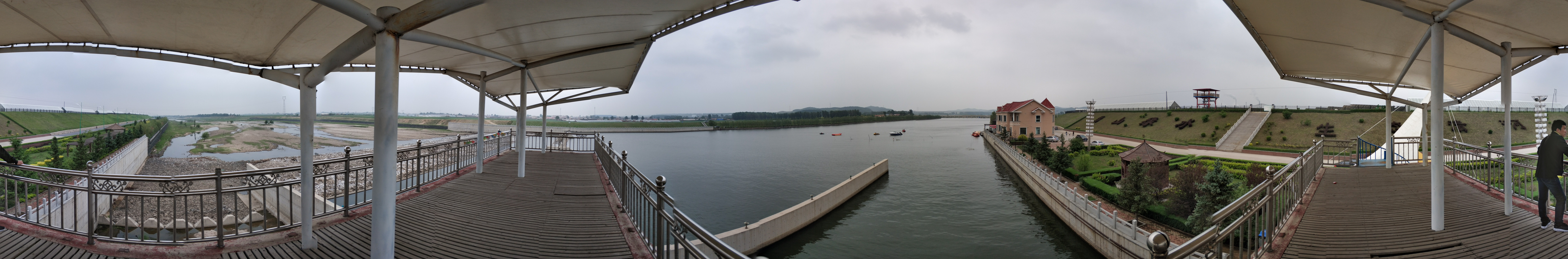

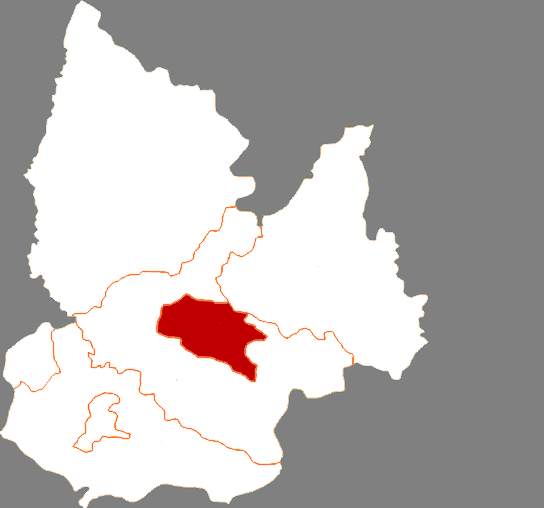
- Qinghe in Tieling

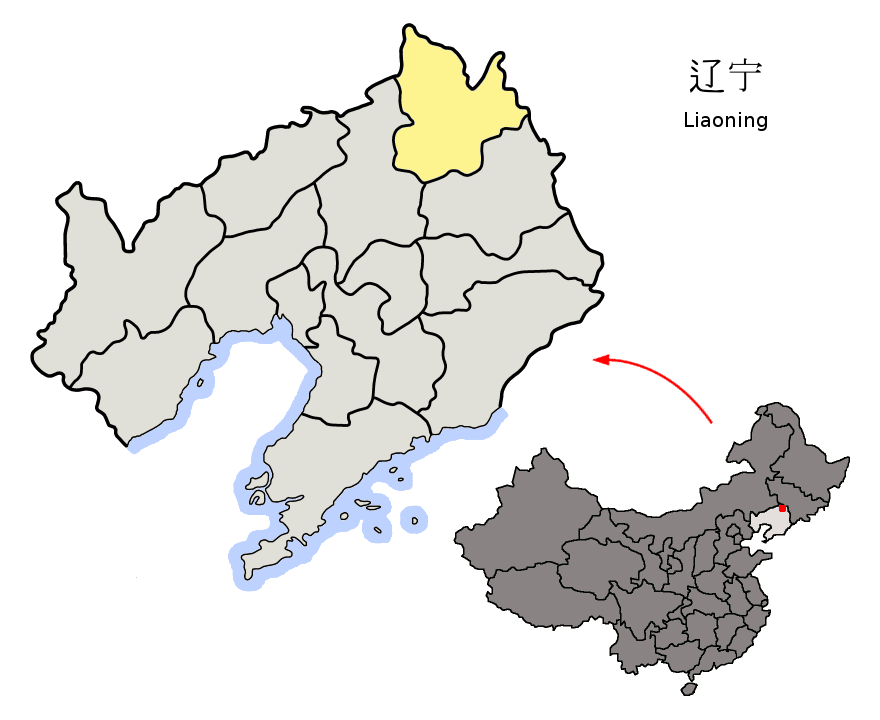
- Tieling in Liaoning
- Country: People's Republic of China
- Province: Liaoning
- Prefecture-level city: Tieling

Area
  - Total: 480 km^{2} (190 sq mi)
- Elevation: 100 m (330 ft)

Population (2020 census)
  - Total: 84,693
  - Density: 180/km^{2} (460/sq mi)
- Time zone: UTC+8 (China Standard)
- Website: http://www.tlqh.gov.cn

Qinghe District (simplified Chinese: 清河区; traditional Chinese: 清河區; pinyin: Qīnghé Qū), previously named as Qinghe Township before the 1980s, is a district of Tieling City.

== Sightseeings ==
- Qinghe Dam

== Administrative Divisions ==
There are two subdistricts, two town, and one ethnic township within the district.

Subdistricts:

- Xiangyang Subdistrict (向阳街道), Hongqi Subdistrict (红旗街道)

Towns:

- Zhangxiang (张相镇), Yangmulinzi (杨木林子镇)

The only township is Niejia Manchu Ethnic Township (聂家满族乡)

== Education ==
There are two elementary schools, one junior high school and one senior high school in the main area. No.1 Elementary School of Qinghe District

No.2 Elementary School of Qinghe District

Qinghe Experimental High School

Qinghe High School
