= Lotus Lake Wetland Park =

Wetland park in Fanhe Town, China

- 莲花湖湿地公园 (Chinese)
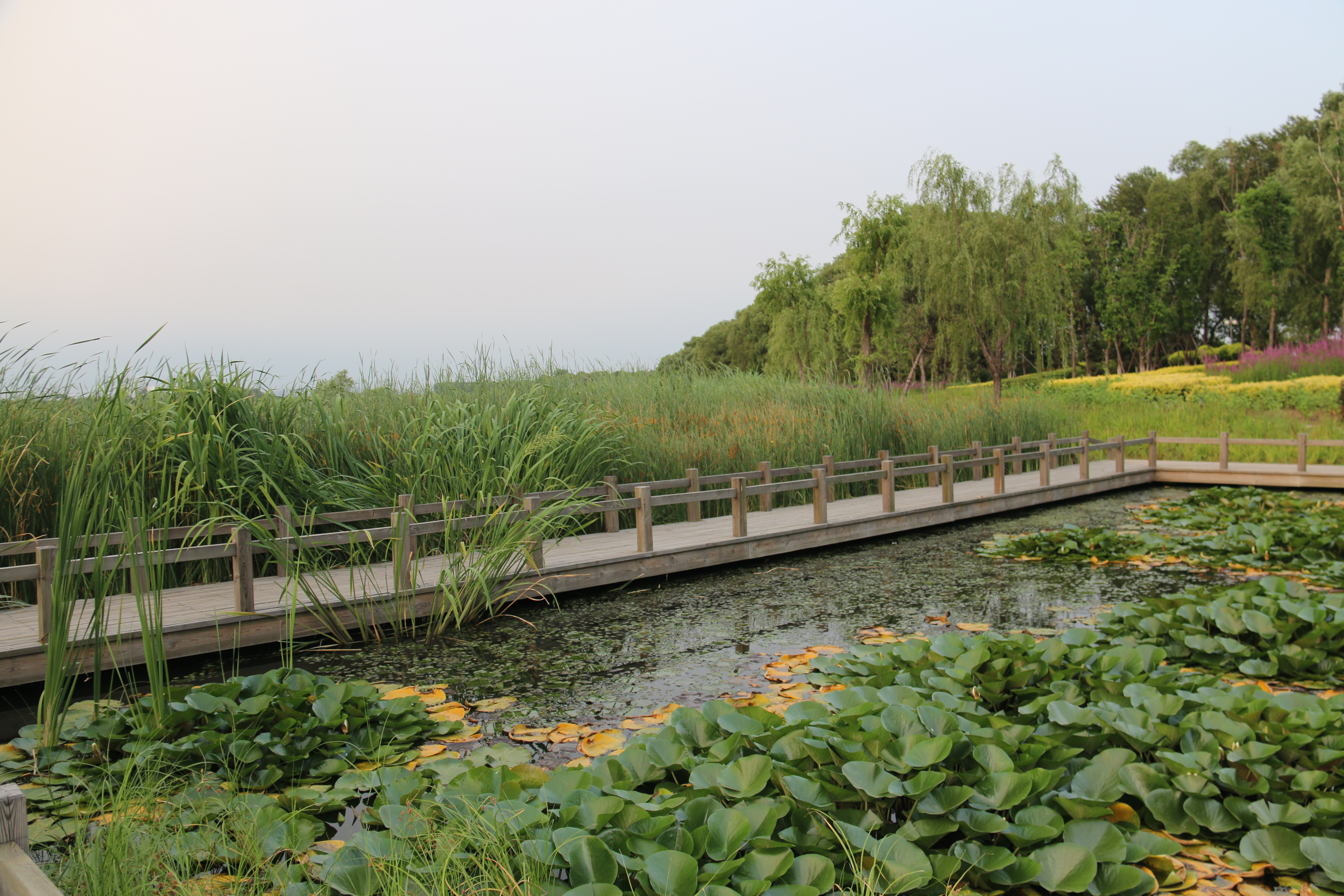
- Lotus Lake Wetland Park in Fanhe Town Tieling City

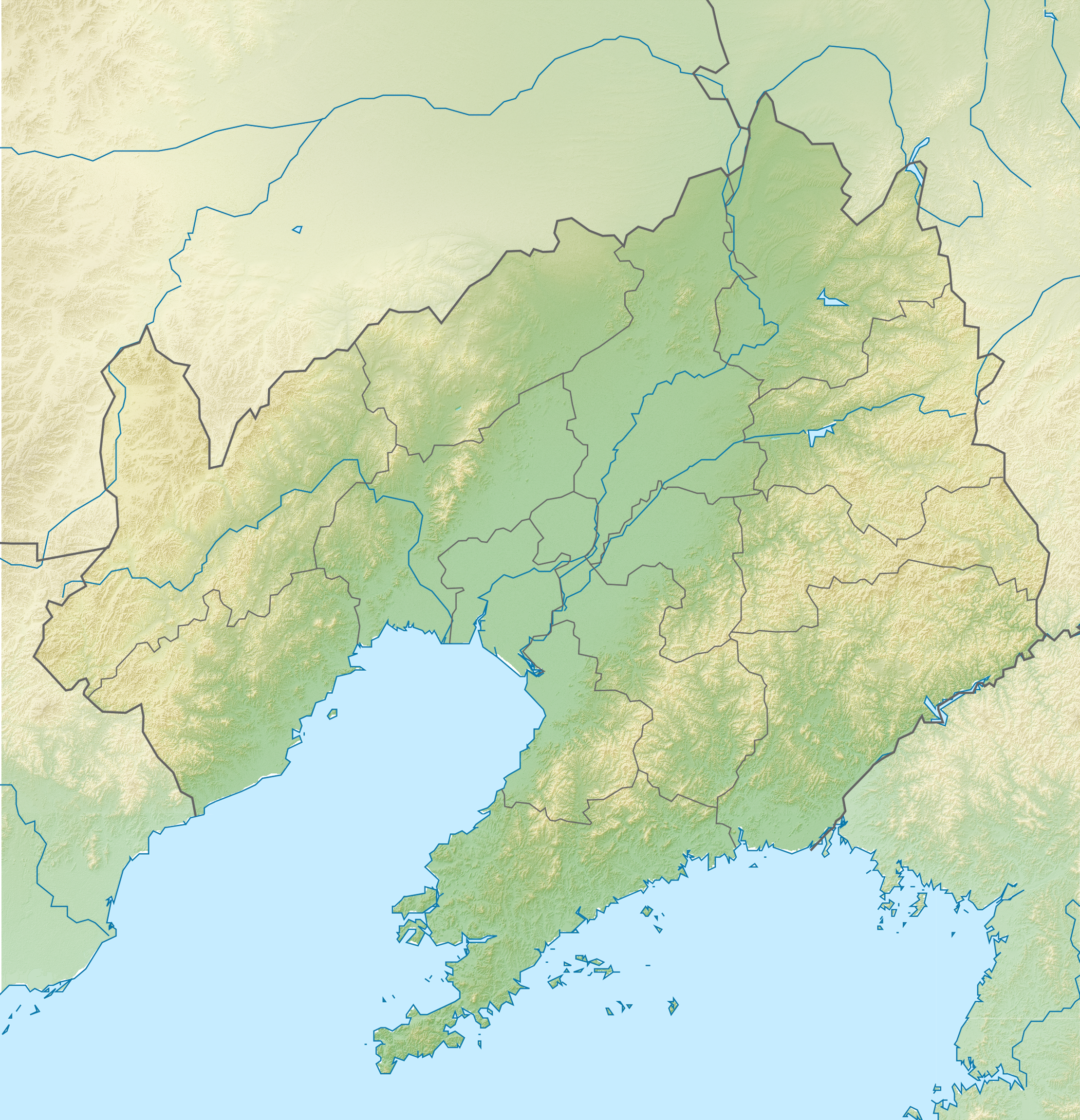
- Location within Liaoning Location within China
- Location: Fanhe Town, Tieling
- Coordinates: 42°16′N 123°44′E

Lotus Lake Wetland Park (Chinese: 莲花湖湿地公园; pinyin: Liánhuāhú Shīdìgōngyuán) is a park located in Fanhe Town, Tieling, Liaoning, China. The wetland park mainly includes Deshengtai Reservoir, Wujiao Lake, Dalianhuapao and Sino-North Korean Friendship Reservoir. It is a complex wetland mainly composed of artificial ponds, rice paddies, rivers and small, shallow lakes, with a total area of 4,226 hectares.

On April 26, 2007, the National Forestry and Grassland Administration officially approved the pilot project of Lotus Lake National Wetland Park in Tieling. The Lotus Lake was historically part of the Northeast Wetland, a type of swamp wetland, with a total drainage area of 200 square kilometers.

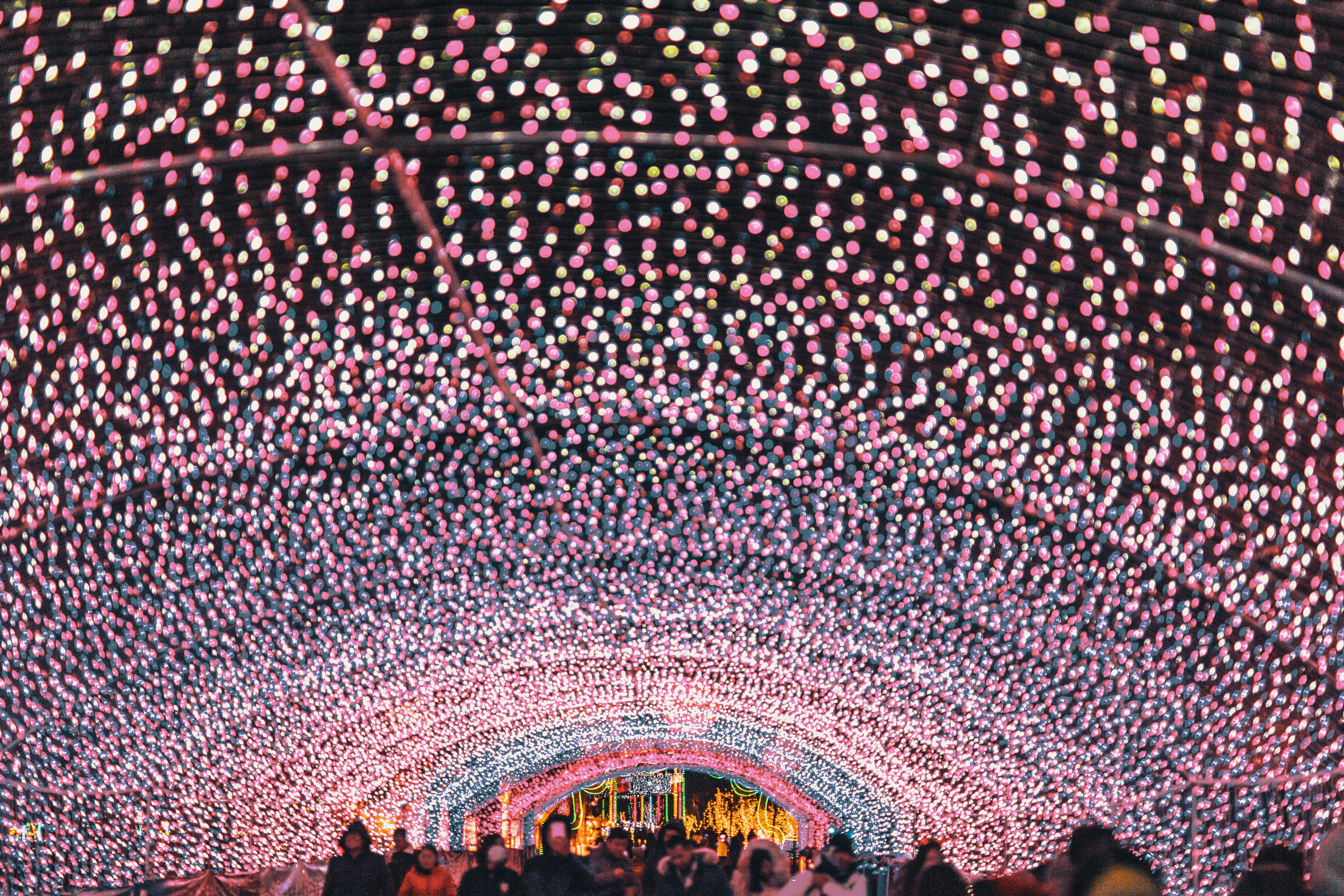
Tieling Lantern Festival - 2017

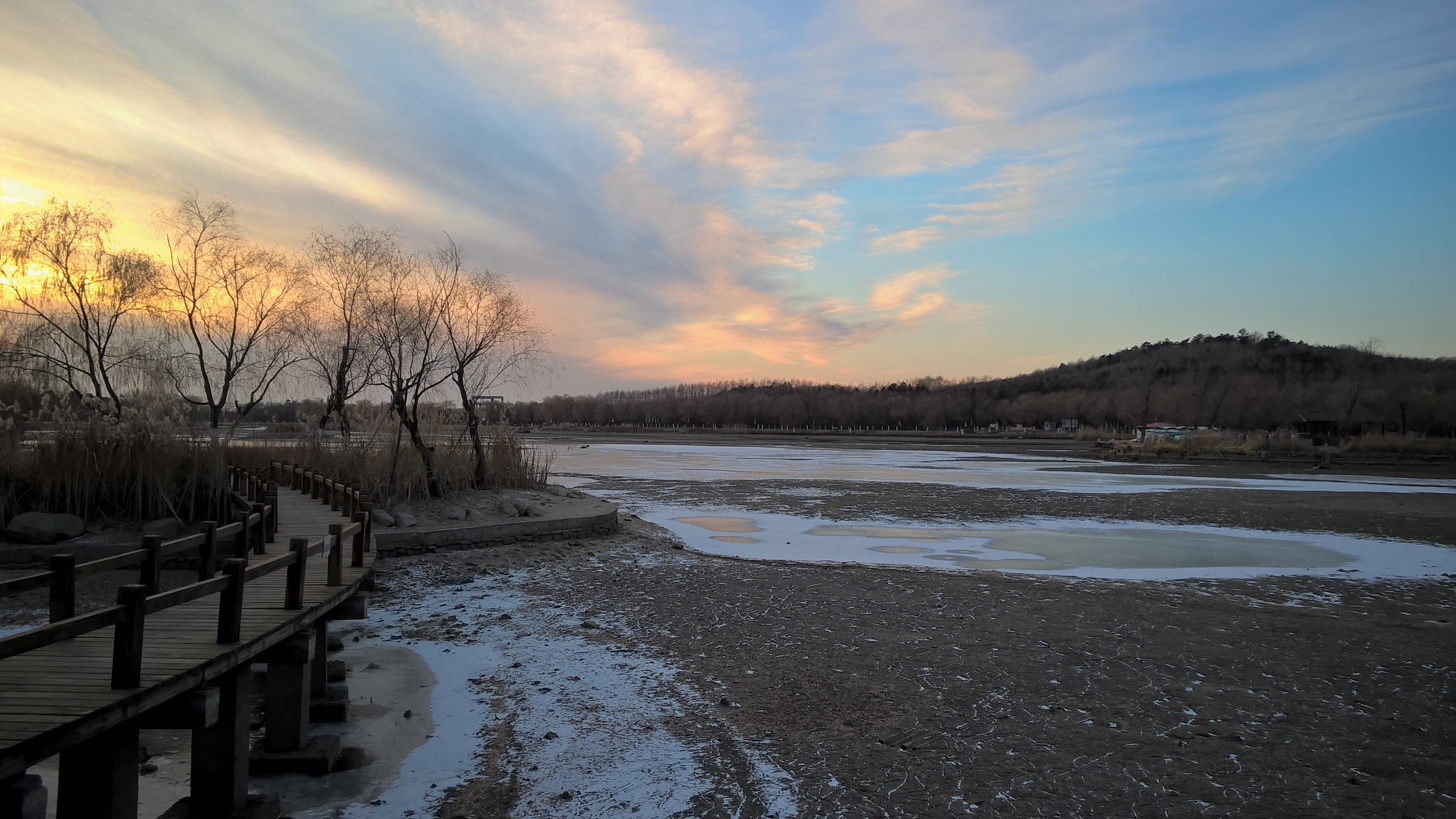
In the Lotus Lake Wetland Park 01

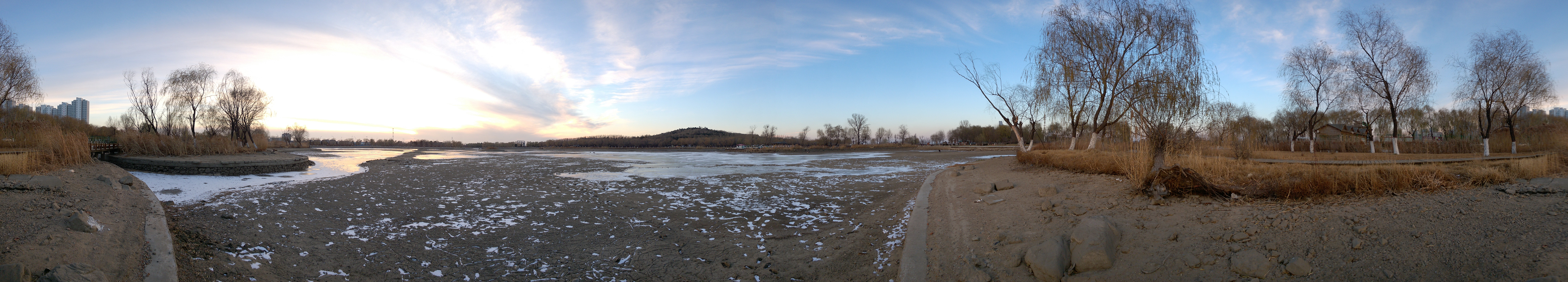
In the Lotus Lake Wetland Park 02
