= Tieling County =

Tieling 铁岭县
- County
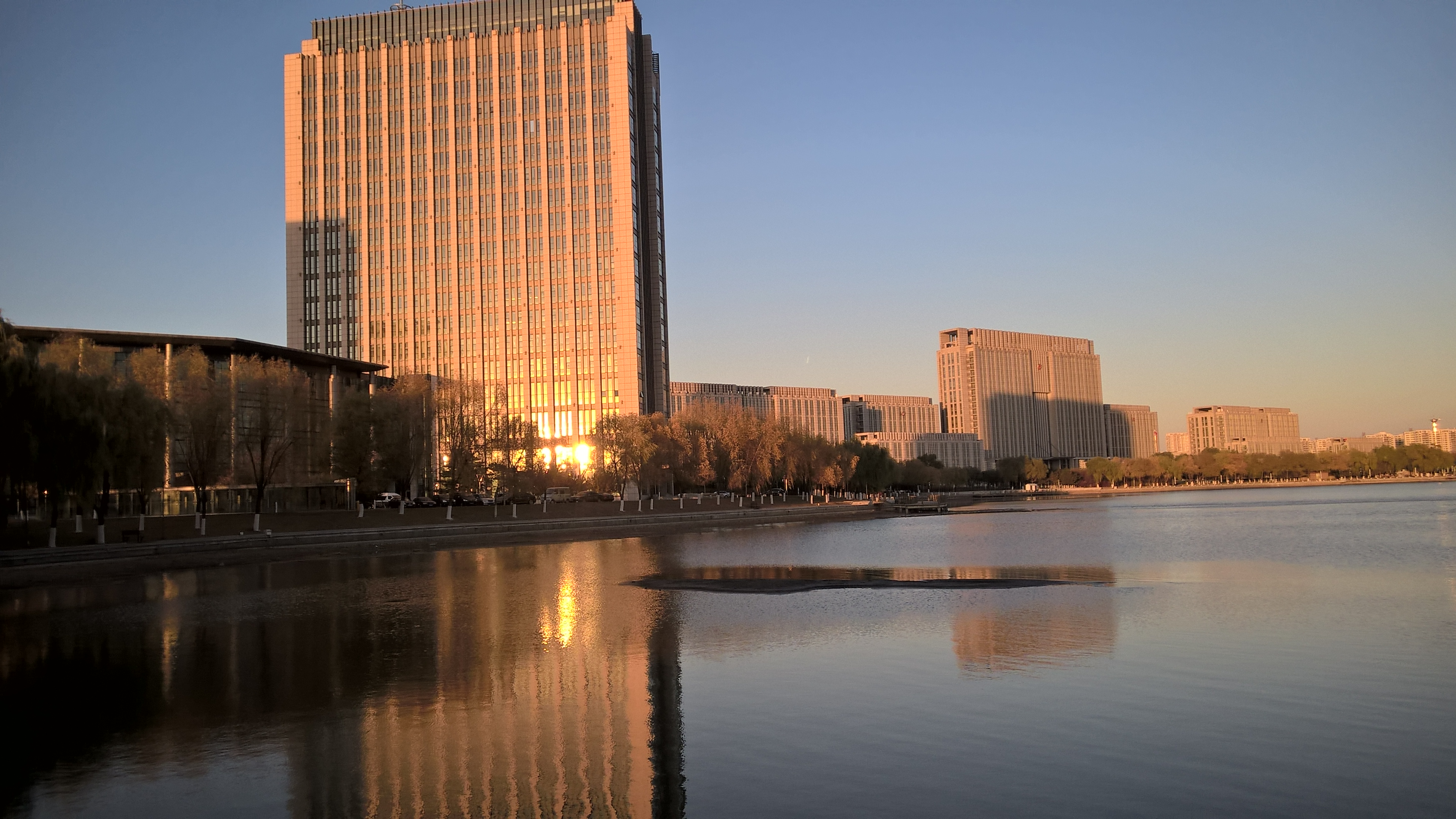

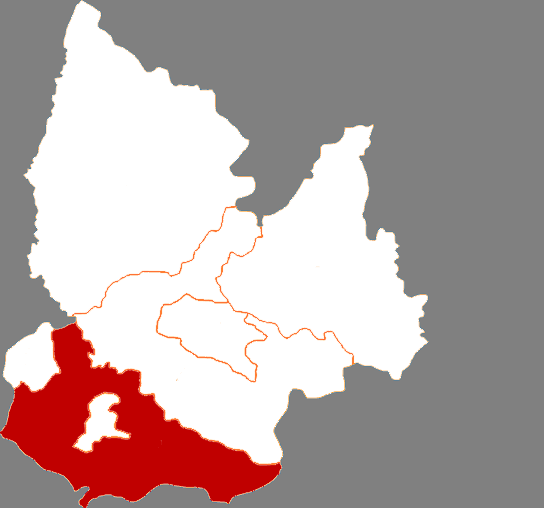
- Tieling County in Tieling City

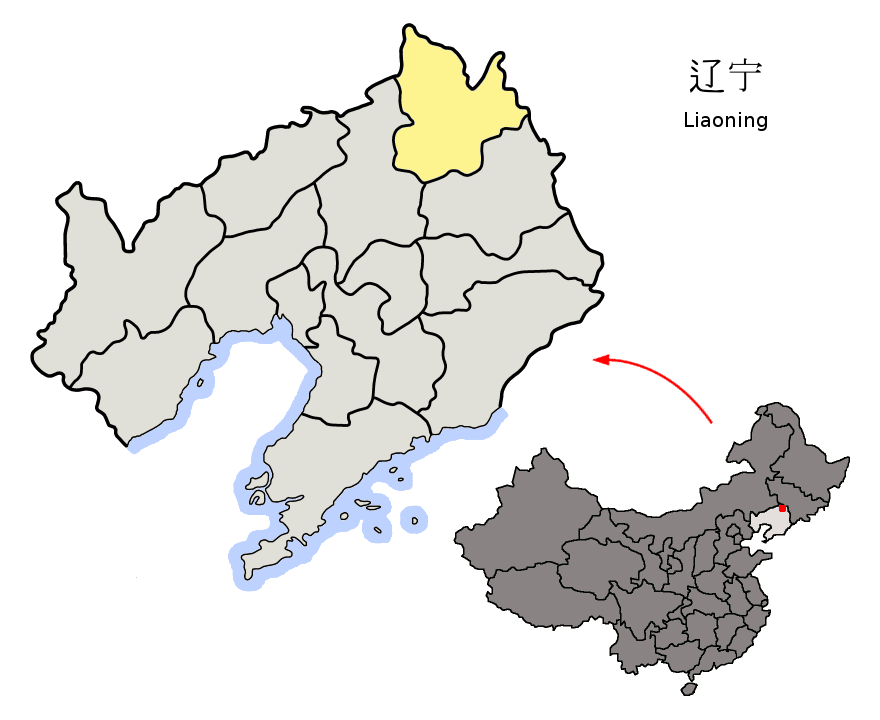
- Tieling City in Liaoning

- Location in Liaoning
- Coordinates: 42°13′N 123°47′E
- Country: People's Republic of China
- Province: Liaoning
- Prefecture-level city: Tieling

Area
  - Total: 2,243 km^{2} (866 sq mi)
- Elevation: 77 m (253 ft)

Population (2020 census)
  - Total: 324,383
  - Density: 144.6/km^{2} (374.6/sq mi)
- Time zone: UTC+8 (China Standard)
- Website: http://www.tielingxian.gov.cn/tltlx/index/index.html

Tieling County (simplified Chinese: 铁岭县; traditional Chinese: 鐵嶺縣; pinyin: Tiělǐng Xiàn) is a county in the northeast of Liaoning province, China. It is the southernmost county-level division of the prefecture-level city of Tieling.

== Administrative divisions ==
There are eight towns and seven townships under the county's administration.

Towns:

- Aji (阿吉镇), Zhenxibao (镇西堡镇), Xintaizi (新台子镇), Yaobao (腰堡镇), Fanhe (凡河镇), Pingdingbao (平顶堡镇), Dadianzi (大甸子镇)

Townships:

- Cainiu Township (蔡牛乡), Shuangjingzi Township (双井子乡), Xiongguantun Township (熊官屯乡), Liqianhu Township (李千户乡), Jiguanshan Township (鸡冠山乡), Hengdaohezi Manchu Ethnic Township (横道河子满族乡), Baiqizhai Manchu Ethnic Township (白旗寨满族乡)
