= Qingyuan Manchu Autonomous County =

Qingyuan 清原县 ᠴᡳᠩᠶᡠᠸᠠᠨ ᠰᡳᠶᠠᠨ
- Autonomous county
- 清原满族自治县 ᠴᡳᠩᠶᡠᠸᠠᠨ ᠮᠠᠨᠵᡠ ᠪᡝᠶᡝ ᡩᠠᠰᠠᠩᡤᠠ ᠰᡳᠶᠠᠨ; Qingyuan Manchu Autonomous County
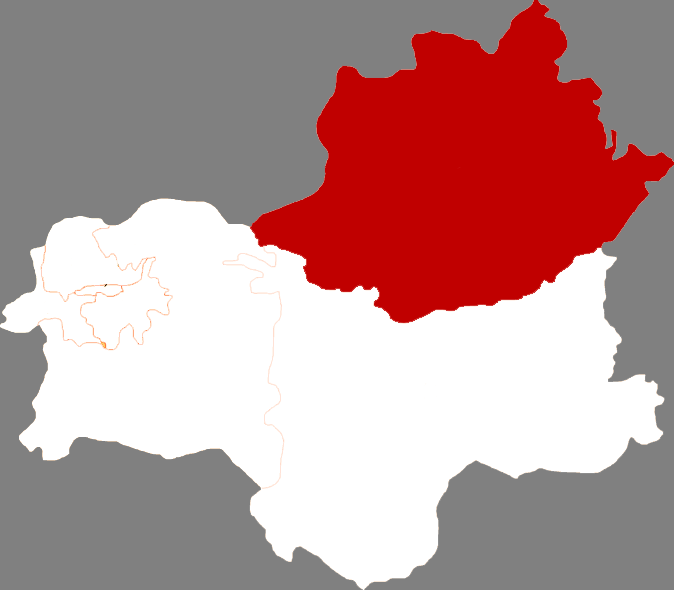
- Qingyuan in Fushun

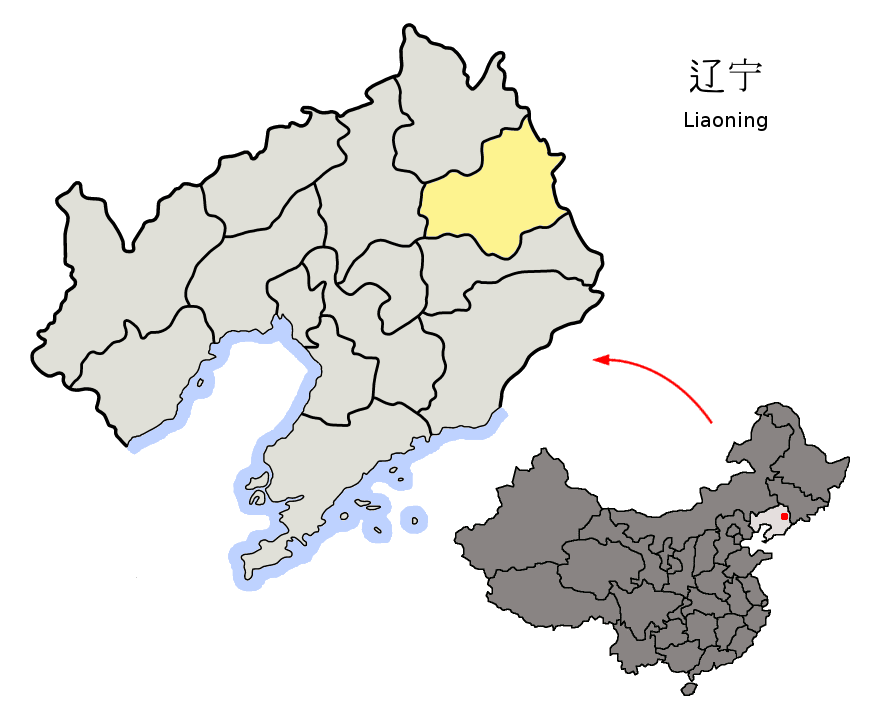
- Fushun in Liaoning
- Coordinates: 42°06′02″N 124°55′27″E
- Country: China
- Province: Liaoning
- Prefecture-level city: Fushun
- County seat: Qingyuan

Area
  - Total: 3,921 km^{2} (1,514 sq mi)
- Elevation: 238 m (781 ft)

Population (2020 census)
  - Total: 238,890
  - Density: 60.93/km^{2} (157.8/sq mi)
- Time zone: UTC+8 (China Standard)
- Postal code: 113300
- Area code: 0413
- Website: www.qingyuan.gov.cn

Qingyuan Manchu Autonomous County (simplified Chinese: 清原满族自治县; traditional Chinese: 清原滿族自治縣; pinyin: Qīngyuán Mǎnzú Zìzhìxiàn, Manchu: ᠴᡳᠩᠶᡠᠸᠠᠨ ᠮᠠᠨᠵᡠ ᠪᡝᠶᡝ ᡩᠠᠰᠠᠩᡤᠠ ᠰᡳᠶᠠᠨ; Möllendorff: cingyuwan manju beye dasangga siyan), or simply Qingyuan County (清原县) is one of the three counties under the administration of the prefecture-level city of Fushun, in the east of Liaoning, China, and is also one of the 11 Manchu autonomous counties and one of 117 autonomous counties nationally. It has a population of about 240,000, covering an area of 3,921 square kilometres (1,514 sq mi).

== Administrative divisions ==
There are 10 towns and 4 townships in the county.

Name	Simplified Chinese	Hanyu Pinyin	Manchu	Möllendorff	Administrative division code
Towns
Qingyuan	清源镇	Qīngyuán zhèn	ᠴᡳᠩ ᠶᡠᠸᠠᠨ ᠵᡝᠨ	cing yuwan jen	210423100
Hongtoushan	红透山镇	Hóngtòushān zhèn	ᡥᡡᠩ ᡨᠣᠣ ᡧᠠᠨ ᠵᡝᠨ	hūng too šan jen	210423101
Caoshi	草市镇	Cǎoshì zhèn	ᡮᠣᠣ ᡧᡳ ᠵᡝᠨ	tsʹoo ši jen	210423103
Ying'emen	英额门镇)	Yīng'émén zhèn	ᠸᡝᠩᡤᡝ ᠸᠠᠰᡝ ᠵᡝᠨ	wengge wase jen	210423104
Nankouqian	南口前镇	Nánkǒuqián zhèn	ᠵᡠᠯᡝᡵᡤᡳ ᡴᠣᡴᡳ ᠵᡝᠨ	julergi koki jen	210423105
Nanshancheng	南山城镇	Nánshānchéng zhèn	ᠨᠠᠨ ᡧᠠᠨ ᠴᡝᠩ ᠵᡝᠨ	nan šan ceng jen	210423106
Wandianzi	湾甸子镇	Wāndiànzi zhèn	ᠸᠠᠨ ᡩᡳᠶᠠᠨ ᡯᡳ᠌ ᠵᡝᠨ	wan diyan dzi jen	210423107
Dagujia	大孤家镇	Dàgūjiā zhèn	ᡩᠠ ᡤᡠ ᠵᡳᠶᠠ ᠵᡝᠨ	da gu jiya jen	210423108
Xiajiabao	夏家堡镇	Xiàjiābǎo zhèn	ᠰᡳᠶᠠ ᠵᡳᠶᠠ ᡦᡡ ᠵᡝᠨ	siya jiya pū jen	210423109
Beisanjia	北三家镇	Běisānjiā zhèn	ᠪᡝᡳ ᠰᠠᠨ ᠵᡳᠶᠠ ᠵᡝᠨ	bei san jiya jen	210423110
Townships
Tukouzi Township	土口子乡	Tǔkǒuzi xiāng	ᡨᠣ᠋ ᡴᡝᠣ ᡯᡳ᠌ ᡤᠠᡧᠠᠨ	to keo dzi gašan	210423203
Aojiabao Township	敖家堡乡	Àojiāpǔ Xiāng	ᡠᠰᡳᡥᠠ ᡦᡠᡯ ᡤᠠᡧᠠᠨ	usiha pudzi gašan	210423206
Dasuhe Township	大苏河乡	Dàsūhé Xiāng	ᡩᠠ ᠰᡠ ᡥᡝ ᡤᠠᡧᠠᠨ	da su he gašan	210423207
Gounai Township	枸乃甸乡	Gǒunǎidiàn Xiāng	ᡤᠣ ᠨᠠᡳ ᡩᡳᠶᠠᠨ ᡤᠠᡧᠠᠨ	go nai diyan gašan	210423208

== Geography and climate ==
Qingyuan is located in the north of Fushun City. It spans 41°48′−42°29′ N latitude and 124°20′−125°29′ E longitude. Bordering county-level divisions are as follows:

In Liaoning:

- Xinbin Manchu Autonomous County – south
- Fushun County – west
- Tieling County – west
- Xifeng County – north
- Kaiyuan – north

In Jilin:

- Dongfeng County – east
- Meihekou – east
- Liuhe County – east

Qingyuan has a monsoon-influenced humid continental climate (Köppen Dwa), characterised by hot, humid summers and long, cold and windy, but dry winters. The four seasons here are distinctive. Over 60% of the annual rainfall of 774 mm (30.5 in) occurs from June to August alone. The monthly 24-hour average temperature ranges from −14.3 °C (6.3 °F) in January to 23.1 °C (73.6 °F) in July, and the annual mean is 6.2 °C (43.2 °F). In winter, due to the elevation and normally dry climate, diurnal temperature variation regularly exceeds 15 °C (27 °F).

Climate data for Qingyuan, elevation 224 m (735 ft), (1991–2020 normals, extremes 1971–2010)
Month	Jan	Feb	Mar	Apr	May	Jun	Jul	Aug	Sep	Oct	Nov	Dec	Year
Record high °C (°F)	6.6 (43.9)	15.5 (59.9)	21.0 (69.8)	30.2 (86.4)	34.0 (93.2)	36.7 (98.1)	37.2 (99.0)	37.1 (98.8)	32.0 (89.6)	29.0 (84.2)	21.3 (70.3)	11.5 (52.7)	37.2 (99.0)
Mean daily maximum °C (°F)	−5.6 (21.9)	−0.8 (30.6)	6.4 (43.5)	16.2 (61.2)	23.0 (73.4)	27.0 (80.6)	29.2 (84.6)	28.2 (82.8)	23.5 (74.3)	15.6 (60.1)	4.8 (40.6)	−3.8 (25.2)	13.6 (56.6)
Daily mean °C (°F)	−14.1 (6.6)	−9.1 (15.6)	−0.6 (30.9)	8.5 (47.3)	15.4 (59.7)	20.4 (68.7)	23.5 (74.3)	22.1 (71.8)	15.7 (60.3)	7.4 (45.3)	−2.1 (28.2)	−11.3 (11.7)	6.3 (43.4)
Mean daily minimum °C (°F)	−20.6 (−5.1)	−15.8 (3.6)	−6.6 (20.1)	1.5 (34.7)	8.4 (47.1)	14.6 (58.3)	18.9 (66.0)	17.6 (63.7)	9.9 (49.8)	1.2 (34.2)	−7.5 (18.5)	−17.1 (1.2)	0.4 (32.7)
Record low °C (°F)	−36.3 (−33.3)	−31.2 (−24.2)	−23.1 (−9.6)	−10.3 (13.5)	−2.5 (27.5)	5.2 (41.4)	10.4 (50.7)	5.3 (41.5)	−3.2 (26.2)	−12.2 (10.0)	−25.4 (−13.7)	−31.7 (−25.1)	−36.3 (−33.3)
Average precipitation mm (inches)	6.0 (0.24)	11.0 (0.43)	19.4 (0.76)	39.7 (1.56)	61.9 (2.44)	108.8 (4.28)	189.2 (7.45)	190.9 (7.52)	56.1 (2.21)	49.9 (1.96)	26.9 (1.06)	12.3 (0.48)	772.1 (30.39)
Average precipitation days (≥ 0.1 mm)	5.2	4.9	6.8	8.6	11.1	14.1	14.2	13.2	8.5	8.3	8.1	6.6	109.6
Average snowy days	9.9	7.4	7.9	2.7	0	0	0	0	0	1.4	7.8	10	47.1
Average relative humidity (%)	70	65	60	54	61	71	79	82	77	70	70	72	69
Mean monthly sunshine hours	171.4	188.1	220.0	221.2	240.8	216.9	191.4	199.1	217.0	198.9	155.5	152.3	2,372.6
Percentage possible sunshine	58	63	59	55	53	48	42	47	59	59	53	54	54
Source 1: China Meteorological Administration
Source 2: Weather China

== Ethnic history ==
Qingyuan is home to a group of ethnicities. The most predominant one has been the Manchu, whom have existed in Liaoning, Jilin, Heilongjiang, and Inner Mongolia for centuries.
