= Xinbin =

Xinbin may refer to:

- Xinbin Manchu Autonomous County, in Liaoning, China
- Xinbin Town, county seat of Xinbin County, Liaoning, China
