= Qingyuan, Qingyuan Manchu Autonomous County =

Qingyuan 清原镇
- Town
- Location in Liaoning
- Coordinates: 42°06′02″N 124°55′27″E
- Country: China
- Province: Liaoning
- Prefecture: Fushun
- County: Qingyuan County

Area
  - Total: 300.32 km^{2} (115.95 sq mi)
- Elevation: 238 m (781 ft)

Population
  - Total: 86,500
  - Density: 288/km^{2} (746/sq mi)
- Time zone: UTC+8 (China Standard)
- Postal code: 113300
- Area code: 0413

Qingyuan (Chinese: 清原; pinyin: Qīngyuán) is a town and the county seat of Qingyuan Manchu Autonomous County, Liaoning, China.
