= Dai Linfeng =

Dai Linfeng (November 1920 - January 30, 2009, Chinese: 戴临风), formerly known as Dai Yongcheng (Chinese: 戴永成), was an ethnic Manchu, a native of Xinbin, Liaoning, and a former vice-president of China Central Television.

== Biography ==
In November 1920, Dai Linfeng was born in Reiziyu, Xinbin County to a small Manchu merchant family. After his grandmother's death and his father's bankruptcy, the family moved to Tianjin in May 1931 and lived on his father's salary as an employee of the Tianjin Lutai Salt Bureau. 1935, Dai Linfeng graduated from the Tianjin No.3 Primary School and was admitted to the Beiping Northeast High School (founded by Zhang Xueliang in 1931). After the signing of the He–Umezu Agreement, all kinds of anti-Japanese rescue activities were banned in North China, and the Northeastern exile groups in North China were ordered to withdraw. The Northeast High School was forced to move to Jigongshan on the border of Henan and Hubei.

In 1938, he left school and went to Chengdu, where he engaged in CCP underground work at the Chengdu branch of the Northeast Salvation Federation. Dai Linfeng and others broadcast songs and anti-Japanese propaganda on the Sichuan Provincial Radio once a week, and he joined the CCP in the same year. After the Chengdu branch of the Northeast Salvation Association was destroyed by the Kuomintang authorities, Dai Linfeng went to Fengxiang Northeast Jingcun Middle School in Shaanxi Province and Xianyang Central Primary School to teach. In July 1942, he was transferred to Yan'an Shaan-Gan-Ning Border Region Art Cadre School (Chinese: 延安陕甘宁边区艺术干部学校) to teach. In October 1942, he worked in Yan'an Shaan-Gan-Ning Border Region Literature Association, and in 1944, he became the director of the research office of Northwest Literature and Art Work Group. 1948, Hu Zongnan's department surrounded Yan'an, and in the defense of Yan'an, Dai Linfeng, as the person in charge of the creative group of Chinese People's Anti-Japanese Military and Political Science University, was instructed to come to the front line. The 36th division of the Kuomintang attacked in the Huti Mountain (Chinese: 壶梯山), Dai Linfeng led the teachers and students to resist the enemy.

In 1949, Dai Linfeng was transferred to the Publicity Department of the CCP Northwest Bureau (Chinese: 中共中央西北局) as an officer, and in 1953, he was transferred to the Publicity Department of the Chinese Communist Party as an officer. In the Korean War, Dai Linfeng, as a member of the Northwest Sympathy Group, went to the front line of North Korea to sympathize with the Chinese People's Volunteers. In 1959, when the Anti-Rightist Campaign began, he was sent down to Leiguan People's Commune.

He was later clarified and returned to the CCP Publicity Department to await assignment. At that time, Beijing TV (the predecessor of today's China Central Television) had just been established in 1958, and Premier Zhou Enlai instructed the CCP Publicity Department to transfer a person to Beijing TV to be its leader. Since 1962, Dai Linfeng has been the director of the Information Department and deputy president of Beijing TV.

On May 1, 1978, Beijing TV was renamed CCTV, and he continued to serve as deputy president. In 1979, Dai led a team to Hong Kong to purchase films and introduced the American TV series Man from Atlantis for the first time in the history of Chinese television. Dai Linfeng also started the business of broadcasting commercial advertisements for Chinese and foreign clients, which was once opposed, but eventually gained the support of Hu Yaobang, the General Secretary of the Chinese Communist Party.

In 1982, Dai Linfeng was removed from his post as deputy president of CCTV and appointed as an advisor to CCTV; he retired from his advisory position in 1985. In his later years, Dai Linfeng suffered from Alzheimer's disease, he died on January 30, 2009, at the age of 89 years.
