= Xintun Subdistrict =

Xintun Subdistrict 新屯街道
- Subdistrict
- Location in Liaoning
- Coordinates: 41°50′16″N 123°58′52″E
- Country: People's Republic of China
- Province: Liaoning
- Prefecture-level city: Fushun
- District: Dongzhou
- Elevation: 124 m (407 ft)
- Time zone: UTC+8 (China Standard)
- Postal code: 113003
- Area code: 0413

Xintun Subdistrict (Chinese: 新屯街道; pinyin: Xīntún Jiēdào) is a subdistrict of Dongzhou District, Fushun, Liaoning province, People's Republic of China. As of 2011, it has 9 residential communities (社区) under its administration.

== See also ==
- List of township-level divisions of Liaoning
