= Fushun County =

Fushun County may refer to two counties of the People's Republic of China:

- Fushun County, Liaoning (抚顺县)
- Fushun County, Sichuan (富顺县)
