= Xiahe (disambiguation) =

Xiahe may refer to the following locations in China:

- Xiahe County (夏河县), Gannan Prefecture, Gansu
- Xiahe Township, Fujian (下河乡), in Yunxiao County
- Xiahe Township, Hebei (下河乡), in Quyang County
- Xiahe Township, Liaoning (峡河乡), in Fushun County
- Xiahe Township, Shandong (下河乡), in Zhanhua County
