= Pingdingshan massacre =

1932 massacre in China by Japan

Coordinates: 41°50′02″N 123°55′32″E

The Pingdingshan massacre (Chinese: 平頂山慘案) was a massacre committed by the Imperial Japanese Army in the village of Pingdingshan, Liaodong, (now part of Dongzhou, Liaoning) on 16 September 1932.

== Massacre ==
On 15 September, Anti-Japanese Red Spear militia, not from the area but passing through Pingdingshan, fired on Japanese soldiers and later attacked the Japanese garrison in the nearby industrial city of Fushun. The next day, in retaliation, Japanese soldiers and police, in tracking the rebels as they fled back through the villages, deemed all who were in the vicinity to be either members of the militia or their confederates, and punished them by burning homes and summarily executing, bayoneting and machine-gunning village residents. Chinese sources place the number of victims at 3,217. Japanese sources place the number of victims at 800. The village was burned down and destroyed.

In 1972, remains of about 800 dead compatriots were found in a mass grave 80 by 5 metres in size. A memorial hall was constructed to house these remains. It is situated on Nanchang Road in Fushun.

A group of Chinese survivors of the massacre demanded 20 million yen from the Japanese government in reparations. In 2006, the Japanese Supreme Court ruled that a national court could not grant wartime indemnities, as this was a matter for international treaties.

In 2009, Kumiko Aihara, a member of the House of Councillors, handed over an apology letter signed by 24 Japanese MPs to massacre survivor Wang Zhimei.
