= Fushun Petrochemical Company =

Refining and petrochemical division of PetroChina

Fushun Petrochemical Company is a refining and petrochemical division of PetroChina. It is located in Fushun, Liaoning province, northeastern China. It is a manufacturer of different petrochemical products, as also catalysts for oil processing and noble metal refining. As of 2006, Fushun Petrochemicals was the world's largest producer of paraffin.

In 2008, Fushun Petrochemical started to build a new refining and petrochemical complex in Fushun, Liaoning Province, China. This complex will include an ethylene, a polypropylene and a high density polyethylene plants. These plants are due to become operational by 2010.

The plants are fed with oil from PetroChina's Daqing Field and import from Russia.
