= Dongzhou District =

District of Fushun City, Liaoning Province, China

Dongzhou 东洲区
- District
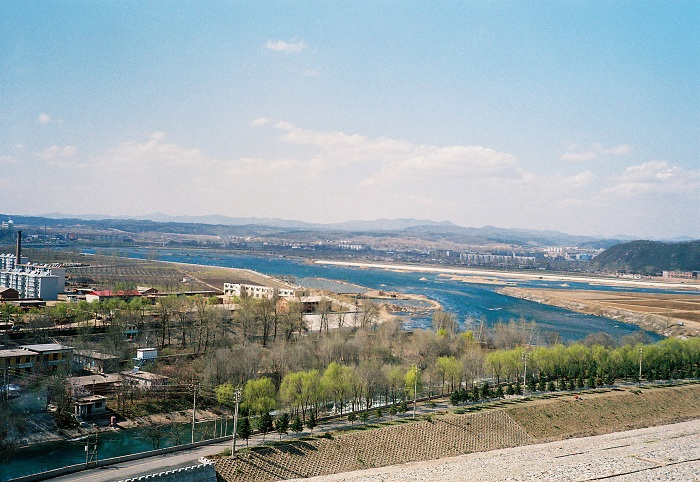

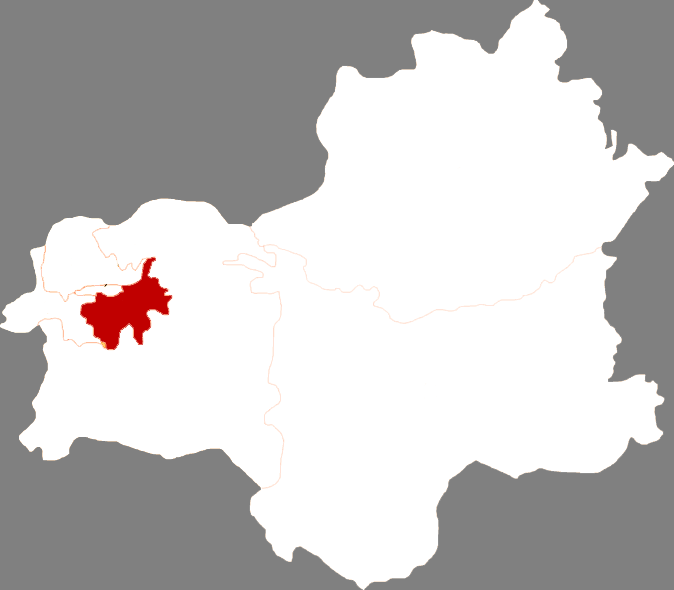
- Location within Fushun City

- Location in Liaoning
- Coordinates: 41°50′07″N 124°00′57″E
- Country: China
- Province: Liaoning
- Prefecture-level city: Fushun
- District seat: Dongzhou Subdistrict (东洲街道)

Area
  - Total: 603.5 km^{2} (233.0 sq mi)

Population (2020 census)
  - Total: 236,731
  - Density: 392.3/km^{2} (1,016/sq mi)
- Time zone: UTC+08:00 (China Standard)
- Postal code: 113003
- Area code: 0413

Dongzhou District (simplified Chinese: 东洲区; traditional Chinese: 東洲區; pinyin: Dōngzhōu Qū; lit. 'Eastern Continent'), is one of the four districts under the administration of Fushun City, in Liaoning Province, China. It has a population of 236,731 in 2020, covering an area of 603.5 square kilometres (233.0 sq mi).

== Administrative divisions ==
There are ten subdistricts and two townships in the district.

Subdistricts:

- Dalian Subdistrict (搭连街道)
- Dongzhou Subdistrict (东洲街道) – Seat of the Dongzhou District People's Government
- Laohutai Subdistrict (老虎台街道)
- Liushan Subdistrict (刘山街道)
- Longfeng Subdistrict (龙凤街道)
- Nanhuayuan Subdistrict (南花园街道)
- Pingshan Subdistrict (平山街道)
- Wanxin Subdistrict (万新街道)
- Xintun Subdistrict (新屯街道)
- Zhangdian Subdistrict (张甸街道)

Townships:

- Nianpan Township (碾盘乡)
- Qianjin Township (千金乡)

== See also ==
- Pingdingshan (village)
