= Xinbin, Liaoning =

Xinbin 新宾 ᡧᡳᠨᠪᡳᠨ
- Town
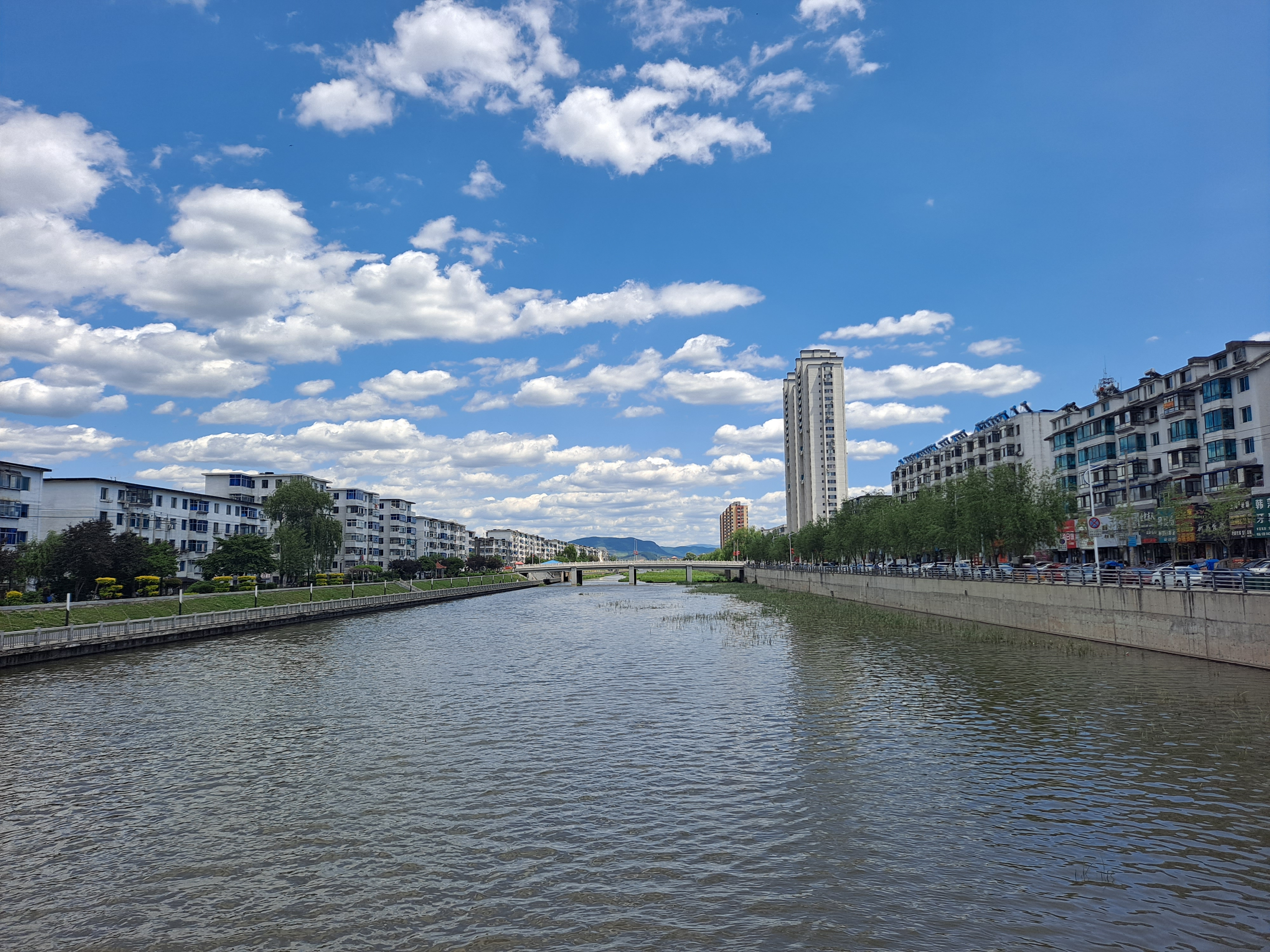

- Location in Liaoning
- Coordinates: 41°44′03″N 125°02′24″E
- Country: People's Republic of China
- Province: Liaoning
- Prefecture-level city: Fushun
- County: Xinbin

Area
  - Total: 388.7 km^{2} (150.1 sq mi)
- Elevation: 315 m (1,033 ft)

Population
  - Total: 65,100
  - Density: 167/km^{2} (434/sq mi)
- Time zone: UTC+8 (China Standard)
- Postal code: 113200
- Area code: 0413

Xinbin (simplified Chinese: 新宾镇; traditional Chinese: 新賓鎮; pinyin: Xīnbīn Zhèn), Manchu: ᡧᡳᠨᠪᡳᠨ
ᡴᠠᡩᠠᠯᠠᠩᡤᠠ, Möllendorff romanization: šinbin kadalaŋga) is a town in and the county seat of Xinbin Manchu Autonomous County, in eastern Liaoning province, China. As of 2011, it has 5 residential communities (社区) and 31 villages under its administration. The town has a population of 65,100 residing in an area of 388.7 km^{2} (150.1 sq mi).

== Infrastructure ==
=== Roads ===
Xinbin is served by three main highways:

- Futong Expressway (S10)
- G229
- G230

=== Airports ===
Shenyang Taoxian International Airport is the closest airport serving Xinbin.
