= Xinbin Manchu Autonomous County =

Xinbin County 新宾县 ᠰᡳᠨᠪᡳᠨ ᠰᡳᠶᠠᠨ
- Autonomous county
- 新宾满族自治县 ᠰᡳᠨᠪᡳᠨ ᠮᠠᠨᠵᡠ ᠪᡝᠶᡝ ᡩᠠᠰᠠᠩᡤᠠ ᡥᡳᠶᠠᠨ; Xinbin Manchu Autonomous County
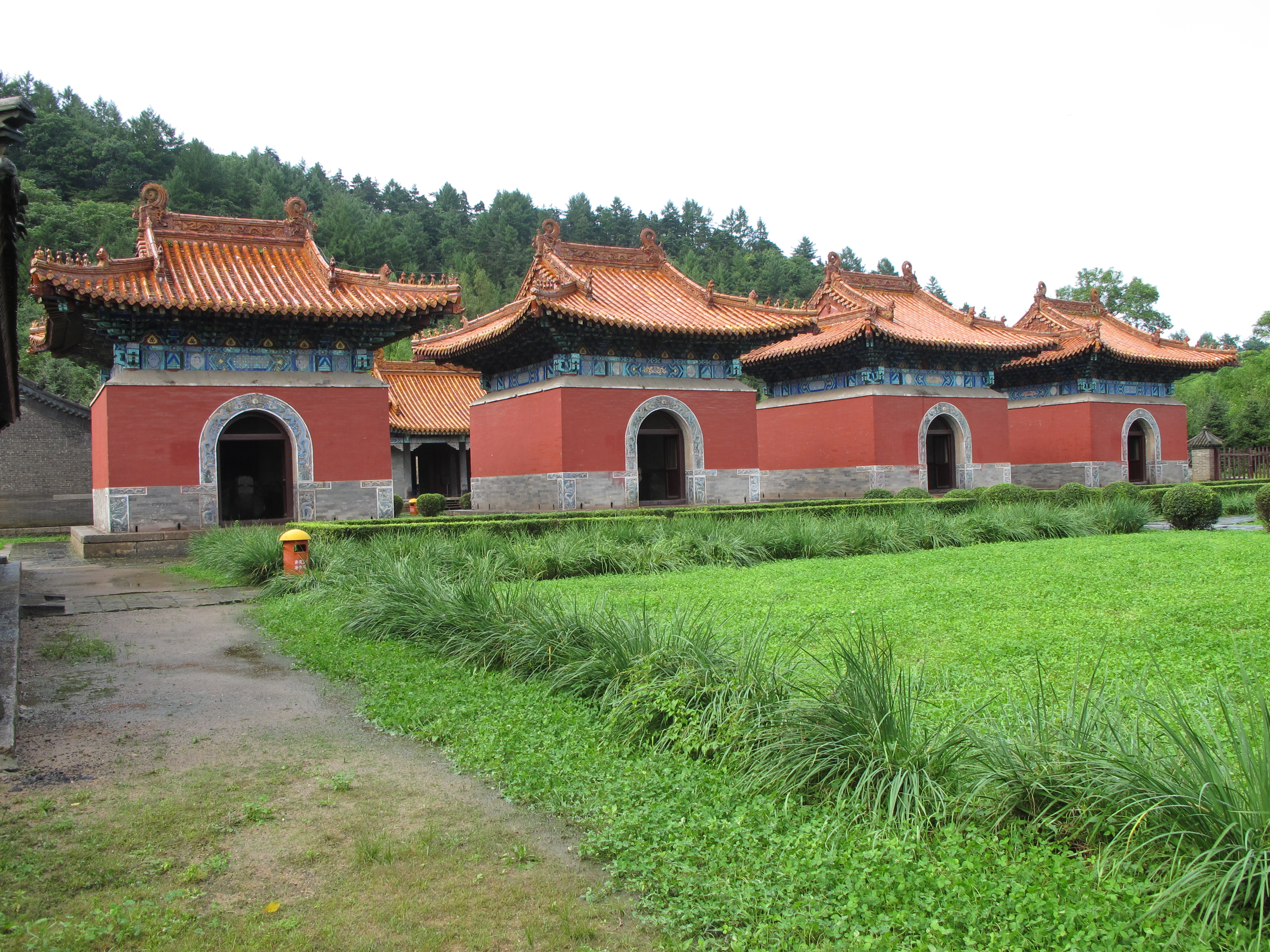
- Pavilions holding tortoise-borne stelae at the Yongling Tombs

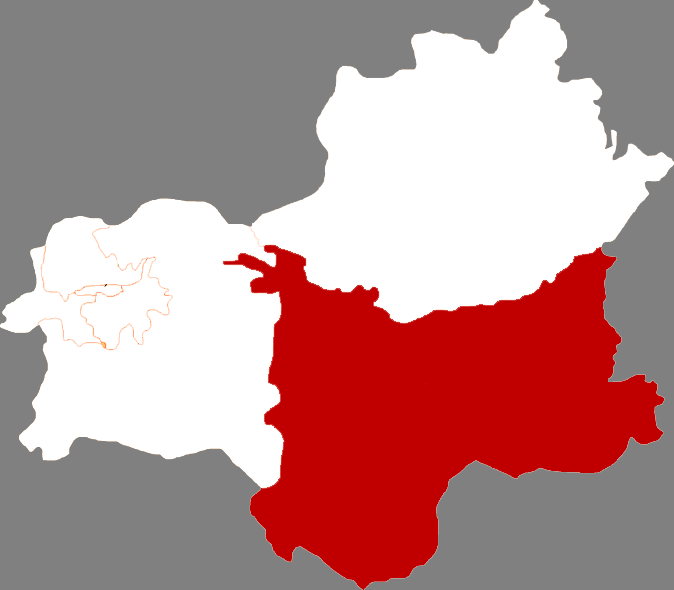
- Xinbin in Fushun

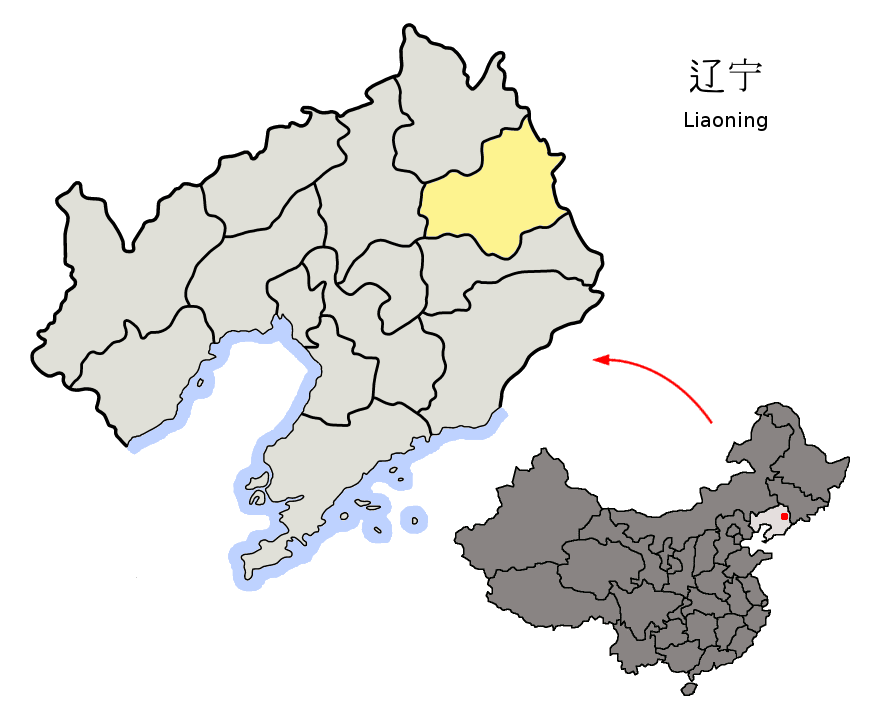
- Fushun in Liaoning
- Coordinates: 41°43′41″N 125°02′20″E
- Country: China
- Province: Liaoning
- Prefecture-level city: Fushun
- County seat: Xinbin Town

Area
  - Total: 4,285 km^{2} (1,654 sq mi)
- Elevation: 360 m (1,180 ft)

Population (2020 census)
  - Total: 217,259
  - Density: 50.70/km^{2} (131.3/sq mi)
- Time zone: UTC+8 (China Standard)
- Postal code: 113200
- Area code: 0413
- Website: www.xinbin.gov.cn

Xinbin Manchu Autonomous County (simplified Chinese: 新宾满族自治县; traditional Chinese: 新賓滿族自治縣; pinyin: Xīnbīn Mǎnzú Zìzhìxiàn, Manchu: ᠰᡳᠨᠪᡳᠨ ᠮᠠᠨᠵᡠ ᠪᡝᠶᡝ ᡩᠠᠰᠠᠩᡤᠠ ᡥᡳᠶᠠᠨ; Möllendorff: sinbin manju beye dasangga hiyan), or simply Xinbin County (postal: Sinpin; simplified Chinese: 新宾县; traditional Chinese: 新賓縣), is one of the three county-level divisions under the administration of the prefecture-level city of Fushun, in the east of Liaoning Province, China, bordering Jilin Province to the east. The autonomous county has a population of 217,259, and covers an area of 4,285 square kilometres (1,654 sq mi).

The county is home to Hetu Ala, the first capital of the Later Jin. The Yongling Mausoleum (清永陵), the joint burials of Mengtemu, Fuman, Giocangga and Taksi, are also located in the autonomous county.

== History ==
Xinbin Manchu Autonomous County was among the first batch of ethnically Manchu autonomous counties established by the State Council in 1985.

== Geography ==
The Suzi River runs through Xinbin Manchu Autonomous County. An October 2022 government publication stated that 75.7% of its land is forested.

The area has a sizable population of Rana chensinensis, a species of frog in the family Ranidae.

=== Climate ===
Climate data for Xinbin, elevation 328 m (1,076 ft), (1991–2020 normals, extremes 1981–2010)
Month	Jan	Feb	Mar	Apr	May	Jun	Jul	Aug	Sep	Oct	Nov	Dec	Year
Record high °C (°F)	7.3 (45.1)	14.5 (58.1)	19.9 (67.8)	29.5 (85.1)	33.2 (91.8)	37.0 (98.6)	36.7 (98.1)	35.7 (96.3)	31.0 (87.8)	28.5 (83.3)	20.2 (68.4)	11.0 (51.8)	37.0 (98.6)
Mean daily maximum °C (°F)	−5.4 (22.3)	−0.8 (30.6)	6.2 (43.2)	15.6 (60.1)	22.4 (72.3)	26.4 (79.5)	28.6 (83.5)	27.8 (82.0)	23.1 (73.6)	15.4 (59.7)	4.7 (40.5)	−3.7 (25.3)	13.4 (56.1)
Daily mean °C (°F)	−14.7 (5.5)	−9.6 (14.7)	−1.0 (30.2)	7.8 (46.0)	14.8 (58.6)	19.8 (67.6)	22.9 (73.2)	21.5 (70.7)	15.0 (59.0)	6.8 (44.2)	−2.6 (27.3)	−11.8 (10.8)	5.7 (42.3)
Mean daily minimum °C (°F)	−21.5 (−6.7)	−16.8 (1.8)	−7.2 (19.0)	0.6 (33.1)	7.5 (45.5)	13.9 (57.0)	18.2 (64.8)	17.1 (62.8)	9.3 (48.7)	0.5 (32.9)	−8.2 (17.2)	−17.9 (−0.2)	−0.4 (31.3)
Record low °C (°F)	−38.3 (−36.9)	−32.4 (−26.3)	−26.8 (−16.2)	−13.2 (8.2)	−3.5 (25.7)	4.5 (40.1)	9.6 (49.3)	4.7 (40.5)	−4.4 (24.1)	−12.5 (9.5)	−26.6 (−15.9)	−32.7 (−26.9)	−38.3 (−36.9)
Average precipitation mm (inches)	5.8 (0.23)	12.0 (0.47)	18.6 (0.73)	38.4 (1.51)	66.6 (2.62)	113.0 (4.45)	183.0 (7.20)	186.4 (7.34)	58.2 (2.29)	46.5 (1.83)	29.5 (1.16)	11.3 (0.44)	769.3 (30.27)
Average precipitation days (≥ 0.1 mm)	5.0	5.0	6.5	8.4	11.3	13.9	14.6	12.9	8.4	8.1	7.9	6.2	108.2
Average snowy days	9.2	7.9	7.9	3.2	0.1	0	0	0	0	1.6	8.1	10.0	48
Average relative humidity (%)	69	66	62	57	64	74	81	84	80	72	72	72	71
Mean monthly sunshine hours	168.7	177.4	209.0	209.1	229.7	202.7	175.9	184.0	198.4	187.0	147.6	145.5	2,235
Percentage possible sunshine	57	59	56	52	51	45	38	43	54	55	51	51	51
Source: China Meteorological Administration

== Administrative divisions ==
There are 9 towns and 6 townships in the autonomous county.

Name	Simplified Chinese	Hanyu Pinyin	Manchu	Möllendorff
Towns
Xinbin Town	新宾镇	Xīnbīn Zhèn	ᡧᡳᠨᠪᡳᠨ ᡴᠠᡩᠠᠯᠠᠩᡤᠠ	šinbin kadalangga
Wangqingmen Town	旺清门镇	Wàngqīngmén Zhèn	ᠸᠠᠩ ᠴᡳᠩ ᠮᡝᠨ ᡴᠠᡩᠠᠯᠠᠩᡤᠠ	wang cing men kadalangga
Yongling Town	二棚甸子镇	Yǒnglíng Zhèn	ᠶᠣᠩ ᠯᡳᠩ ᡴᠠᡩᠠᠯᠠᠩᡤᠠ	yong ling kadalangga
Pingdingshan Town	平顶山镇	Píngdǐngshān Zhèn	ᡦᡳᠩ ᡩᡳᠩ ᡧᠠᠨ ᡴᠠᡩᠠᠯᠠᠩᡤᠠ	ping ding šan kadalangga
Dasiping Town	大四平镇	Dàsìpíng Zhèn	ᡩᠠᡳ ᠰᡟ ᡦᡳᠩ ᡴᠠᡩᠠᠯᠠᠩᡤᠠ	dai sy ping kadalangga
Weiziyu Town	苇子峪镇	Wěizǐyù Zhèn	ᠸᡝᡳ ᡰᡳ ᠶᡠ᠌ ᡴᠠᡩᠠᠯᠠᠩᡤᠠ	wei ži yu" kadalangga
Muqi Town	木奇镇	Mùqí Zhèn	ᠮᡠ᠌ ᠴᡳ ᡴᠠᡩᠠᠯᠠᠩᡤᠠ	mu" ci kadalangga
Shangjiahe Town	上夹河镇	Shàngjiáhé Zhèn	ᡧᠠᠩ ᡧᡠᠸᠠᠩ ᡥᡝ ᡴᠠᡩᠠᠯᠠᠩᡤᠠ	šang šuwang he kadalangga
Nanzamu Town	南杂木镇	Nánzámù Zhèn	ᠨᠠᠨ ᡰᠠ ᠮᡠ᠌ ᡴᠠᡩᠠᠯᠠᠩᡤᠠ	nan ža mu" kadalangga
Township
Hongsheng Township	红升乡	Hóngshēng Xiāng	ᡥᡡᠩ ᡧᡝᠩ ᡤᠠᡧᠠᠨ	hūng šeng gašan
Xiangshuihezi Township	响水河子乡	Xiǎngshuǐhézǐ Xiāng	ᠰᡳᠶᠠᠩ ᡧᠣᡳ ᡥᡝ ᡯᡳ᠌ ᡤᠠᡧᠠᠨ	siyang šoi he dzi" gašan
Hongmiaozi Township	红庙子乡	Hóngmiàozǐ Xiāng	ᡥᡡᠩ ᠮᡳᠶᠣᠣᡯᡳ᠌ ᡤᠠᡧᠠᠨ	hūng miyoodzi" gašan
Beisiping Township	北四平乡	Běisìpíng Xiāng	ᠪᡝᡳ ᠰᡟ ᡦᡳᠩ ᡤᠠᡧᠠᠨ	bei sy ping gašan
Yushu Township	榆树乡	Yúshù Xiāng	ᠶᡠ ᡧᡠ ᡤᠠᡧᠠᠨ	yu šu gašan
Xiajiahe Township	下夹河乡	Wěizǐyù Xiāng	ᠰᡳᠠ ᠵᡳᠠ ᡥᡝ ᡤᠠᡧᠠᠨ	sia jia he gašan

== Demographics ==
Xinbin Manchu Autonomous County recorded a population of 217,259 in the 2020 Chinese Census, down -14.50% from the 254,118 recorded in the 2010 Chinese Census. An October 2022 government publication stated that over 80% of its population is ethnically Manchu.

As of 2020, the autonomous county's population is 50.42% male, and 49.58% female. 10.72% of its population is under 15 years old, 61.35% is 15-59 years old, and 27.93% is over 59 years old, including 19.00% that is 65 years or older.

== Economy ==
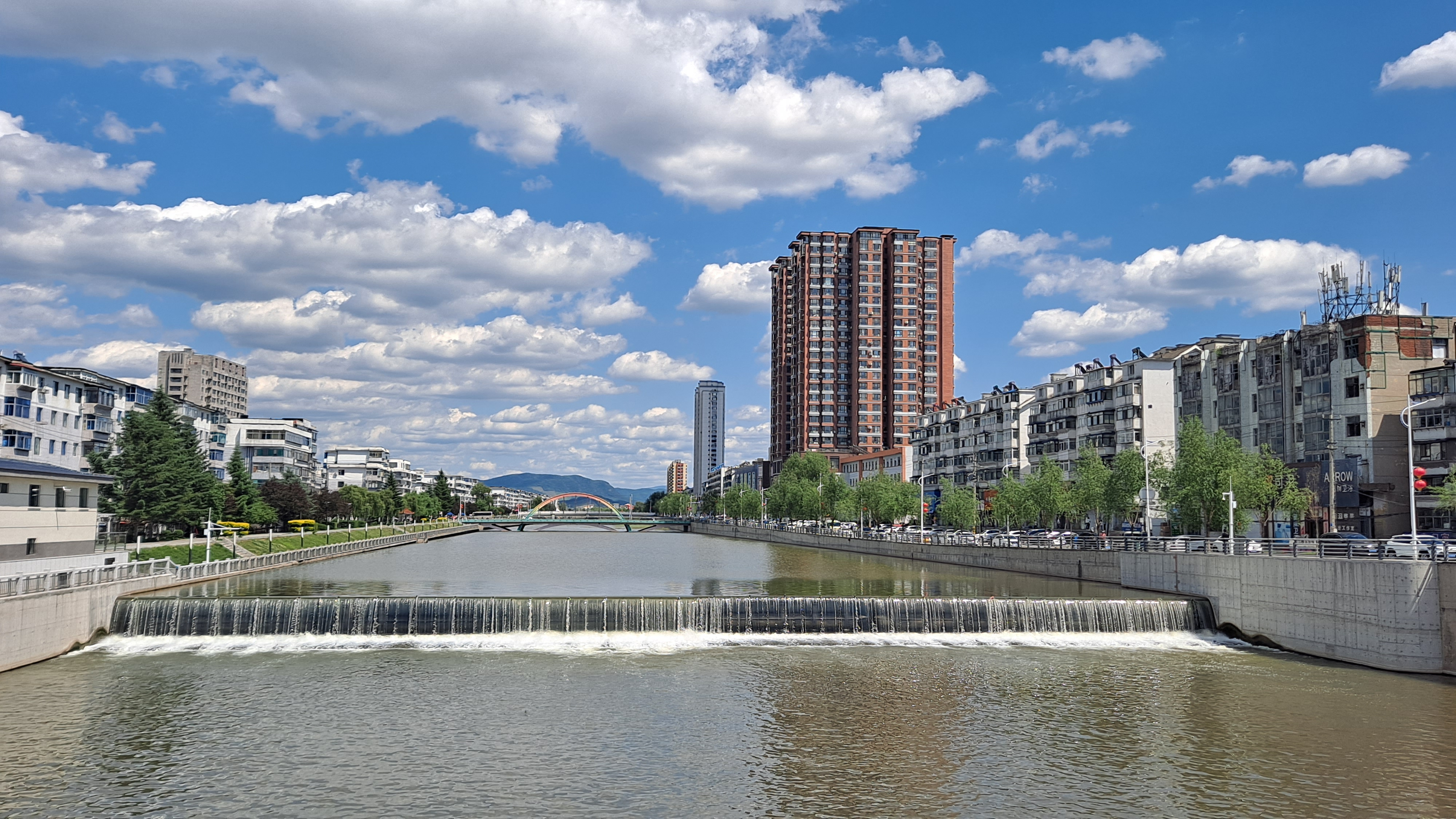
The Suzi River flowing through Xinbin Manchu Autonomous County

As of 2024, Xinbin Manchu Autonomous County has a gross domestic product (GDP) of 6.349 billion renminbi (RMB), a 5.4% increase from the previous year. Of this, the autonomous county's primary sector accounted for 1.854 billion RMB (29.20% of total GDP), the secondary sector accounted for 1.323 billion RMB (20.84%), and the tertiary sector accounted for 3.171 billion RMB (49.94%). In 2024, local public budget revenue totaled 0.550 billion RMB, while the local public budget expenditure totaled 2.484 billion RMB. Retail sales of consumer goods that year totaled 1.416 billion RMB.

The per capita disposable income for rural residents of the autonomous county totaled 21,011 RMB in 2024.

Major mineral deposits in Xinbin Manchu Autonomous County include iron, molybdenum, coal, and limestone.

The autonomous county is a notable domestic center for the production of edible fungi. A common type of livestock in the autonomous county is the Rongshan Goat (Chinese: 绒山羊; pinyin: Róngshān Yáng), a breed of goat used for its wool.

== Transportation ==
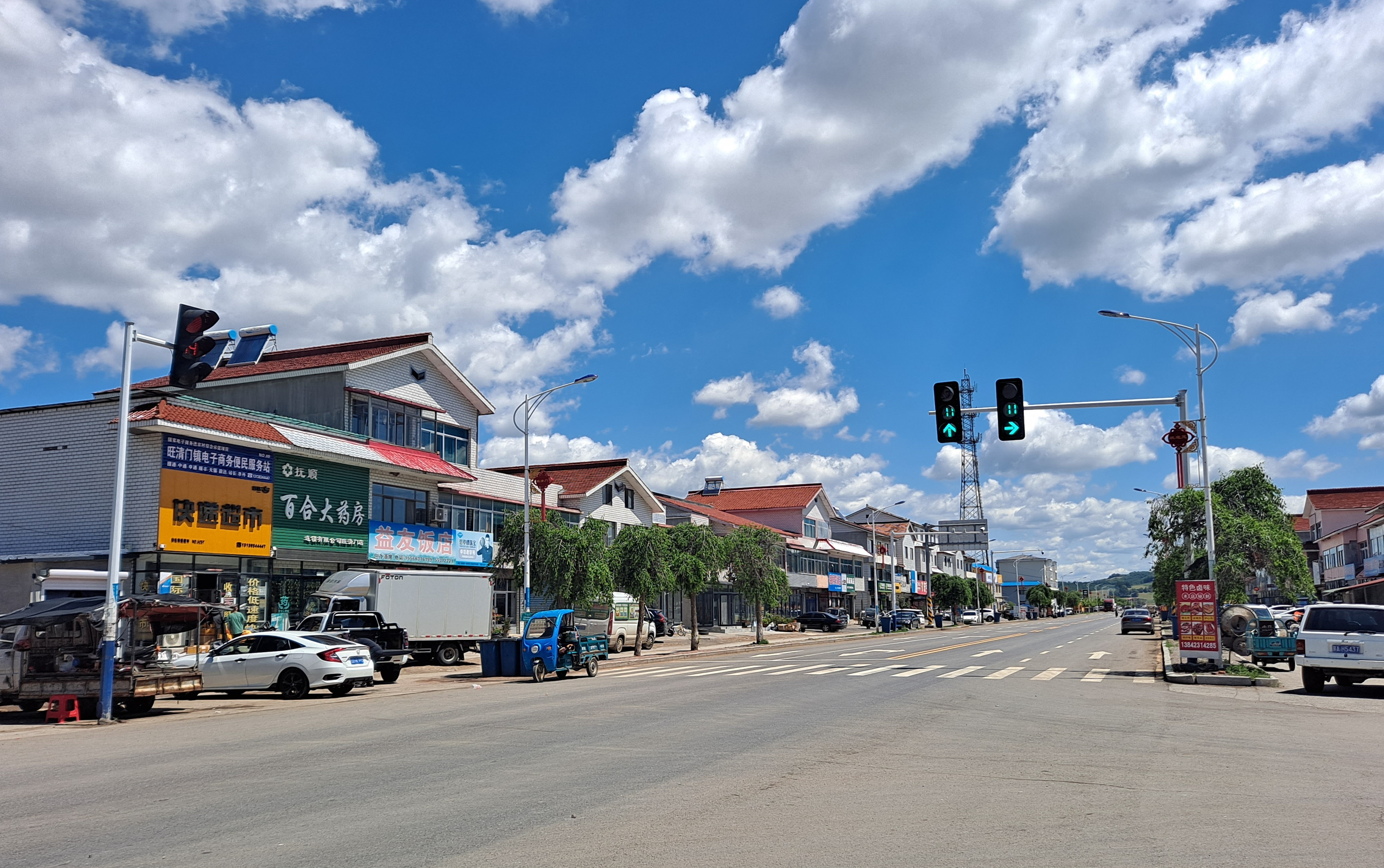
A road running through the town of Wangqingmen

China National Highway 230 runs through Xinbin Manchu Autonomous County.

Xinbin Railway Station, located along the Shenyang–Baihe high-speed railway, is situated within the autonomous county.
