= Fushun County, Liaoning =

Fushun 抚顺县
- County
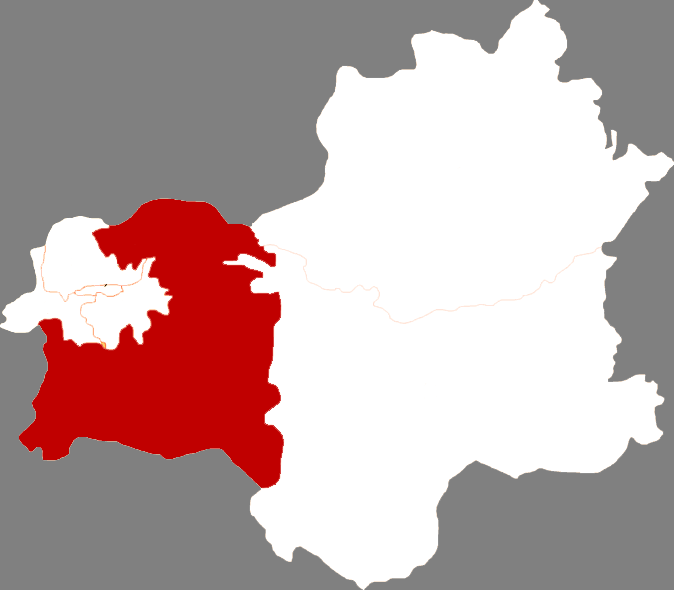
- Fushun County in Fushun City

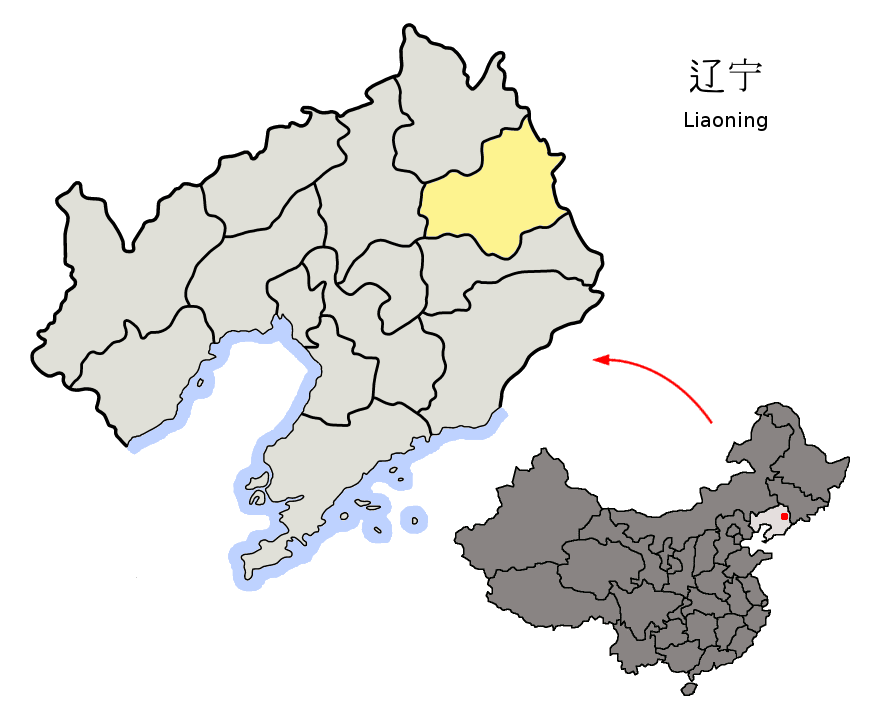
- Fushun City in Liaoning
- Coordinates (Zhangdang government): 41°55′10″N 124°05′06″E
- Country: People's Republic of China
- Province: Liaoning
- Prefecture-level city: Fushun

Area
  - Land: 2,350 km^{2} (910 sq mi)

Population (2020 census)
  - Total: 83,125
  - Density: 35.4/km^{2} (91.6/sq mi)
- Time zone: UTC+8 (China Standard)

Fushun County (simplified Chinese: 抚顺县; traditional Chinese: 撫順縣; pinyin: Fǔshùn Xiàn), is one of the three counties under the administration of the prefecture-level city of Fushun, in the east of Liaoning province, China. It has a population of about 83,000 in 2020, covering an area of 2,350 square kilometres (910 sq mi).

== Administrative Divisions ==
There are four towns, six townships, and two ethnic townships in the county.

Towns:

- Zhangdang (章党镇), Shiwen (石文镇), Hou'an (后安镇), Hada (哈达镇)

Townships:

- Xiahe Township (峡河乡), Jiubing Township (救兵乡), Hailang Township (海浪乡), Maquanzi Township (马圈子乡), Shangma Township (上马乡), Lanshan Township (兰山乡), Lagu Manchu Ethnic Township (拉古满族乡), Tangtu Manchu Ethnic Township (汤图满族乡)
