= Fushun =

Fushun 抚顺市
- Prefecture-level city
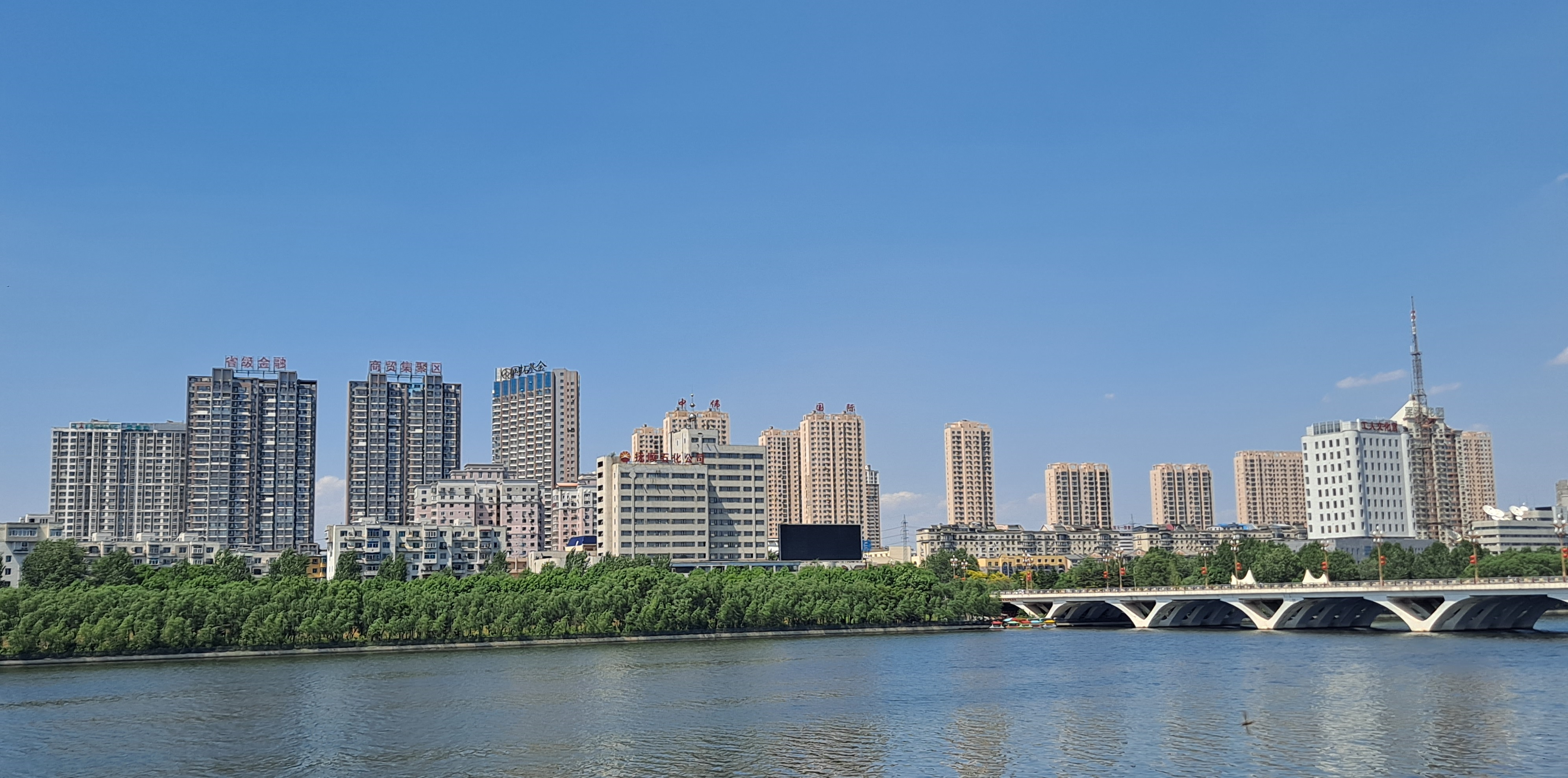
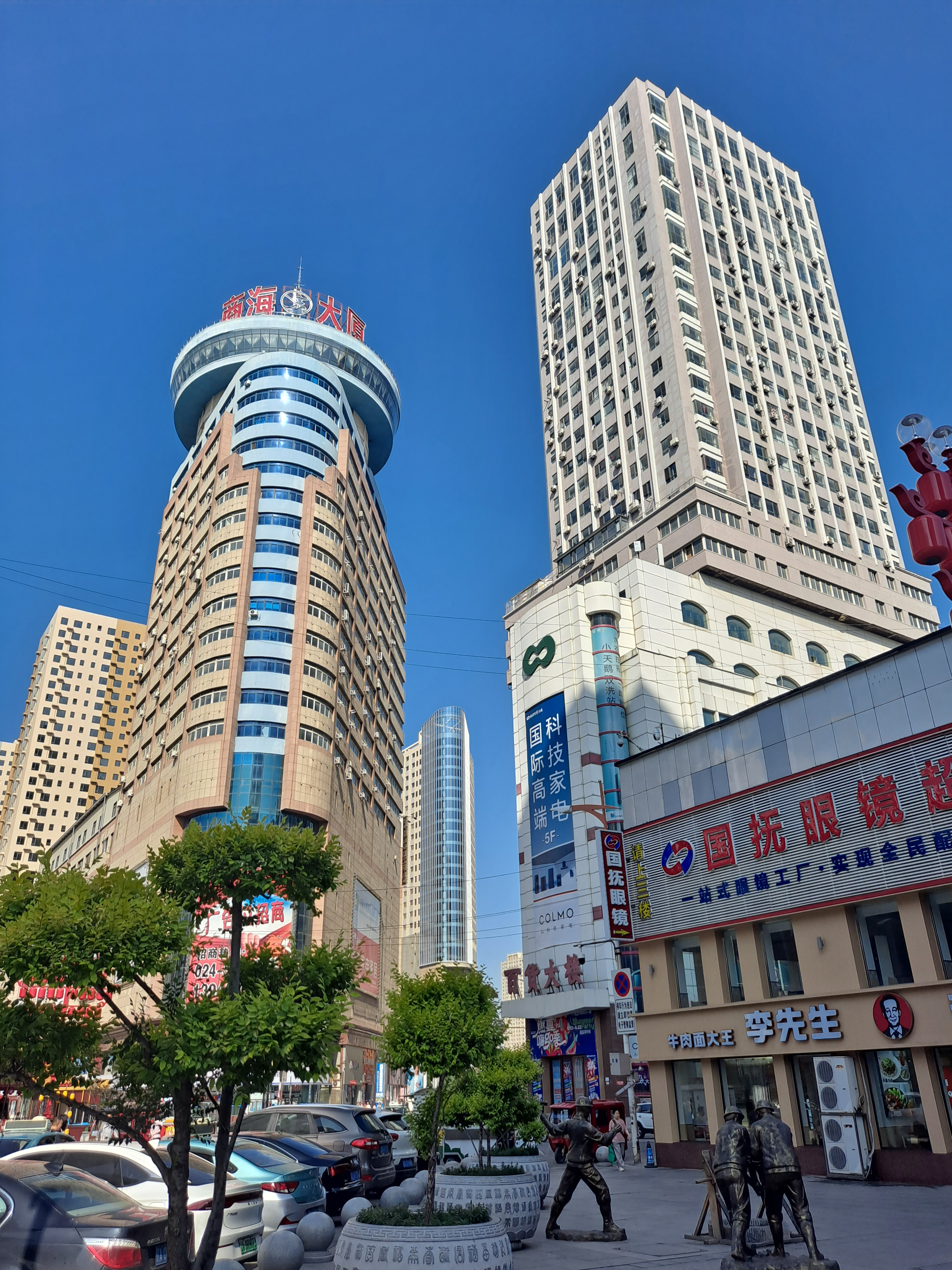
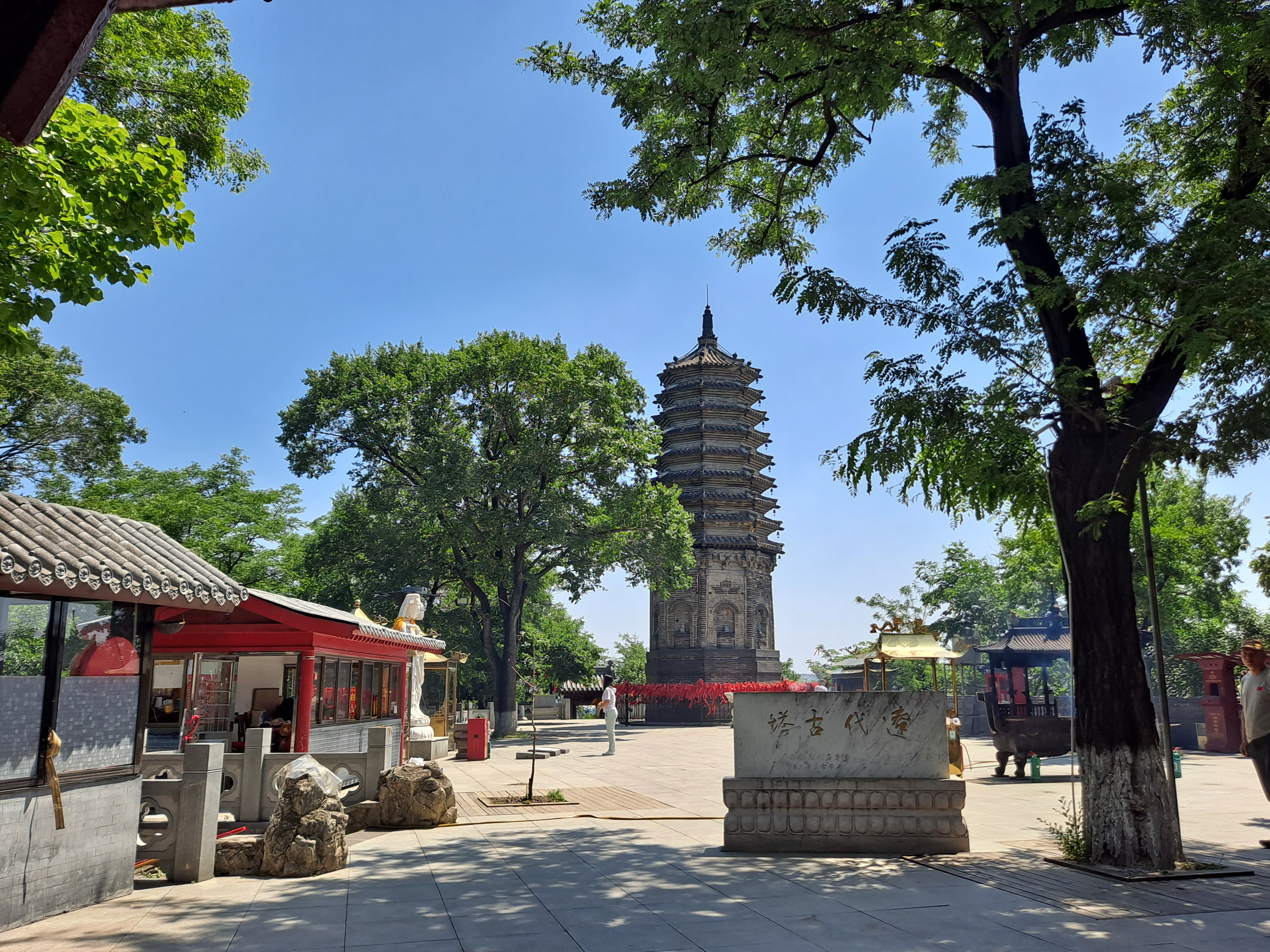
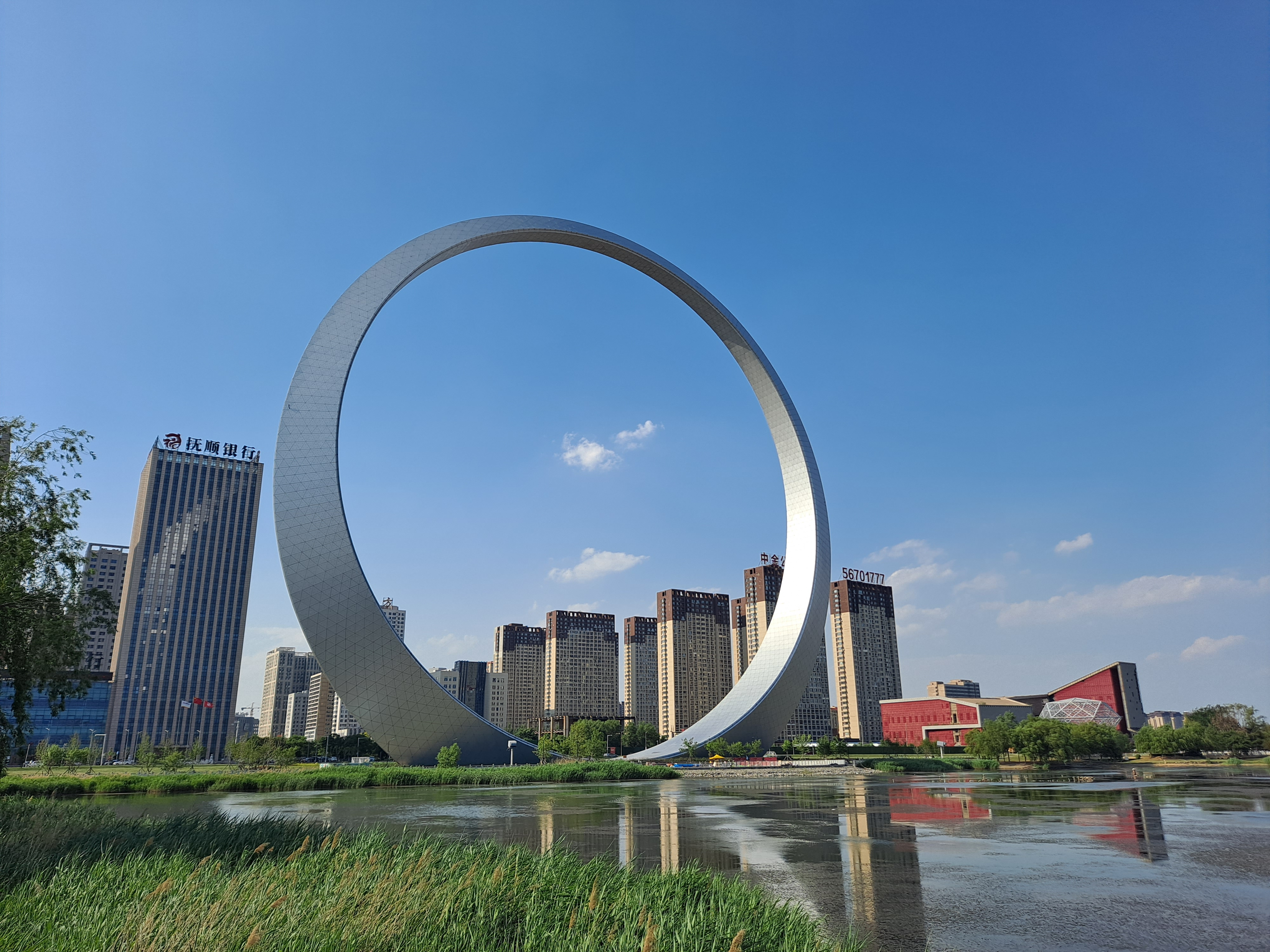
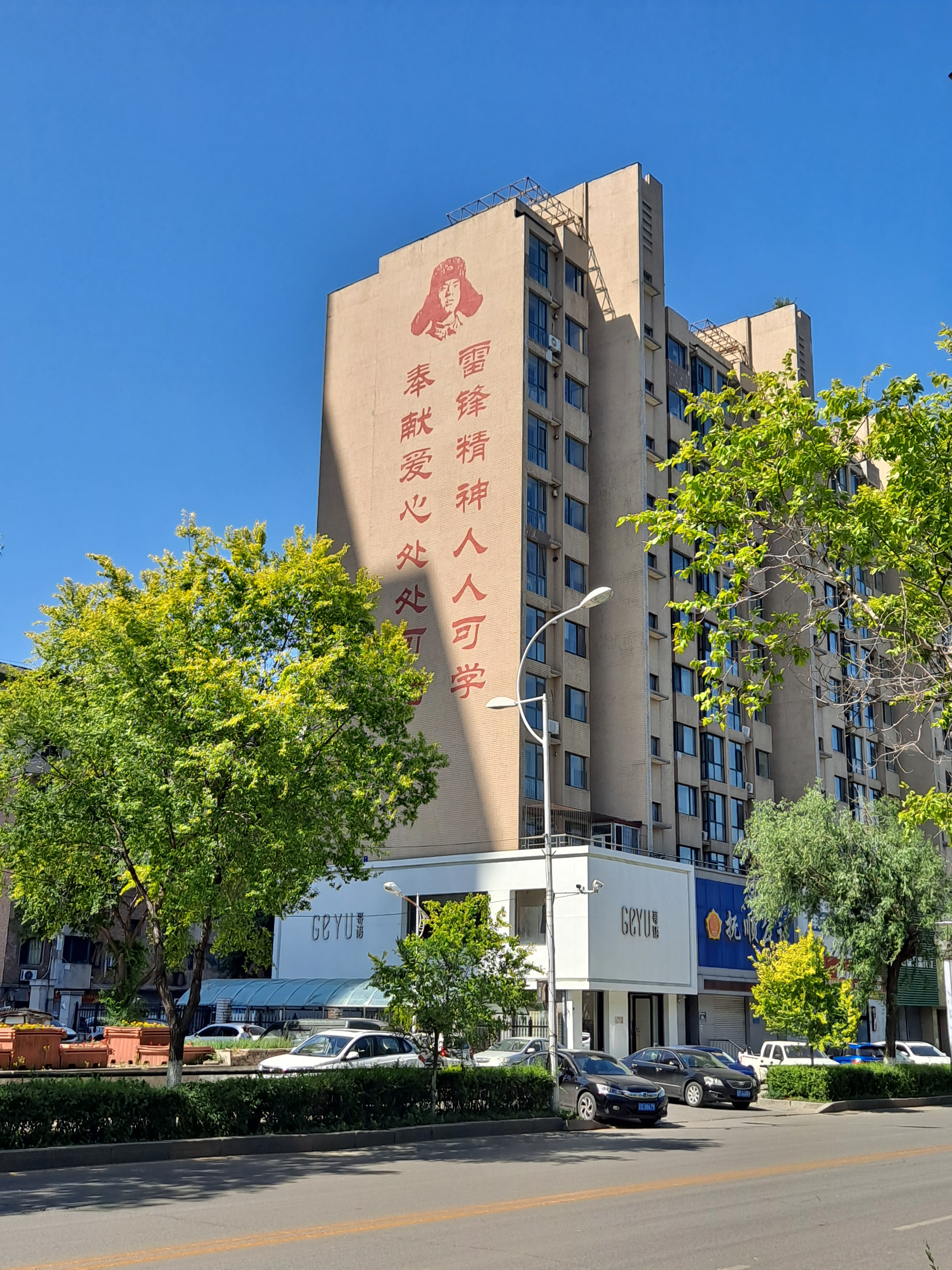
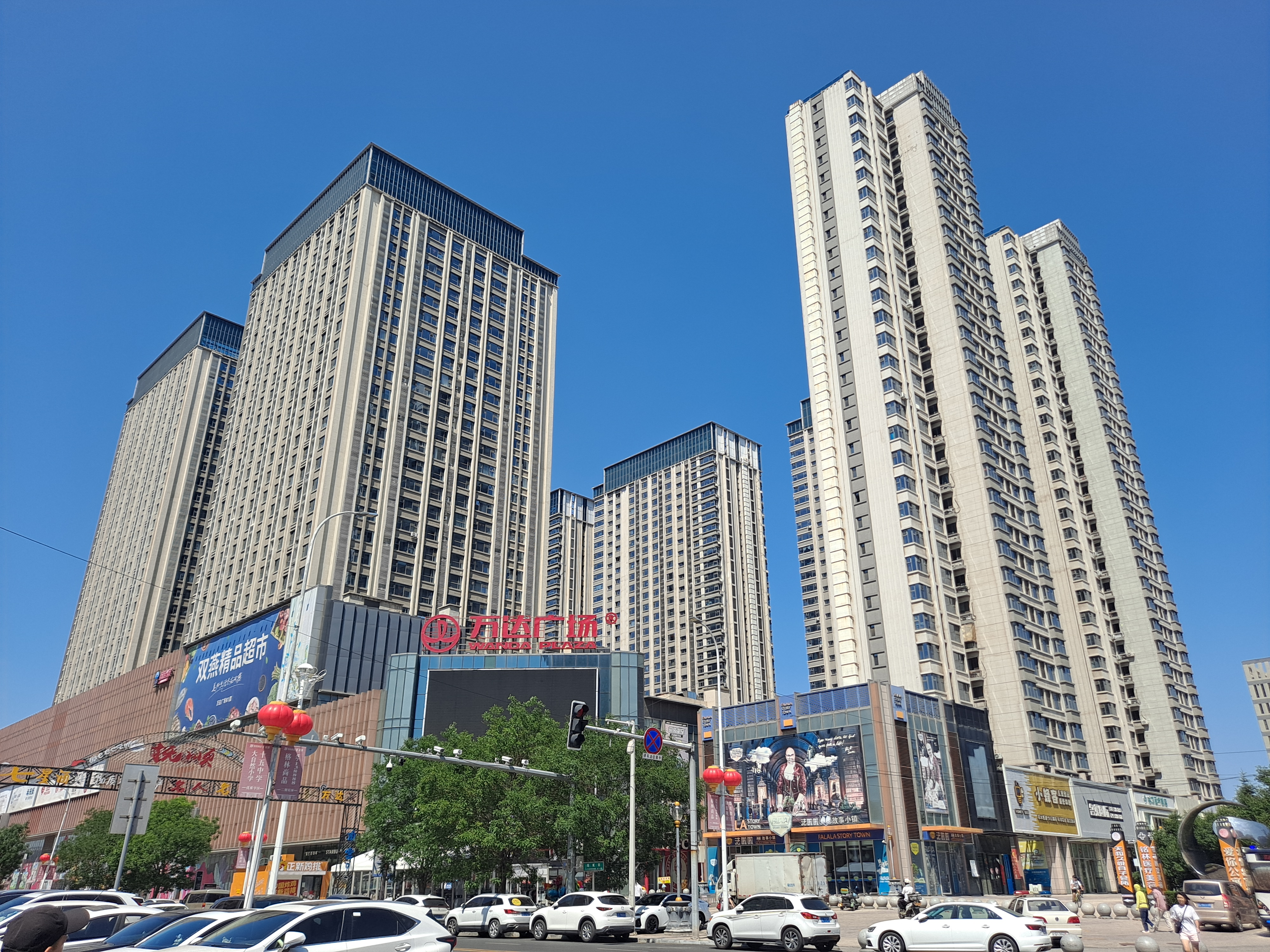
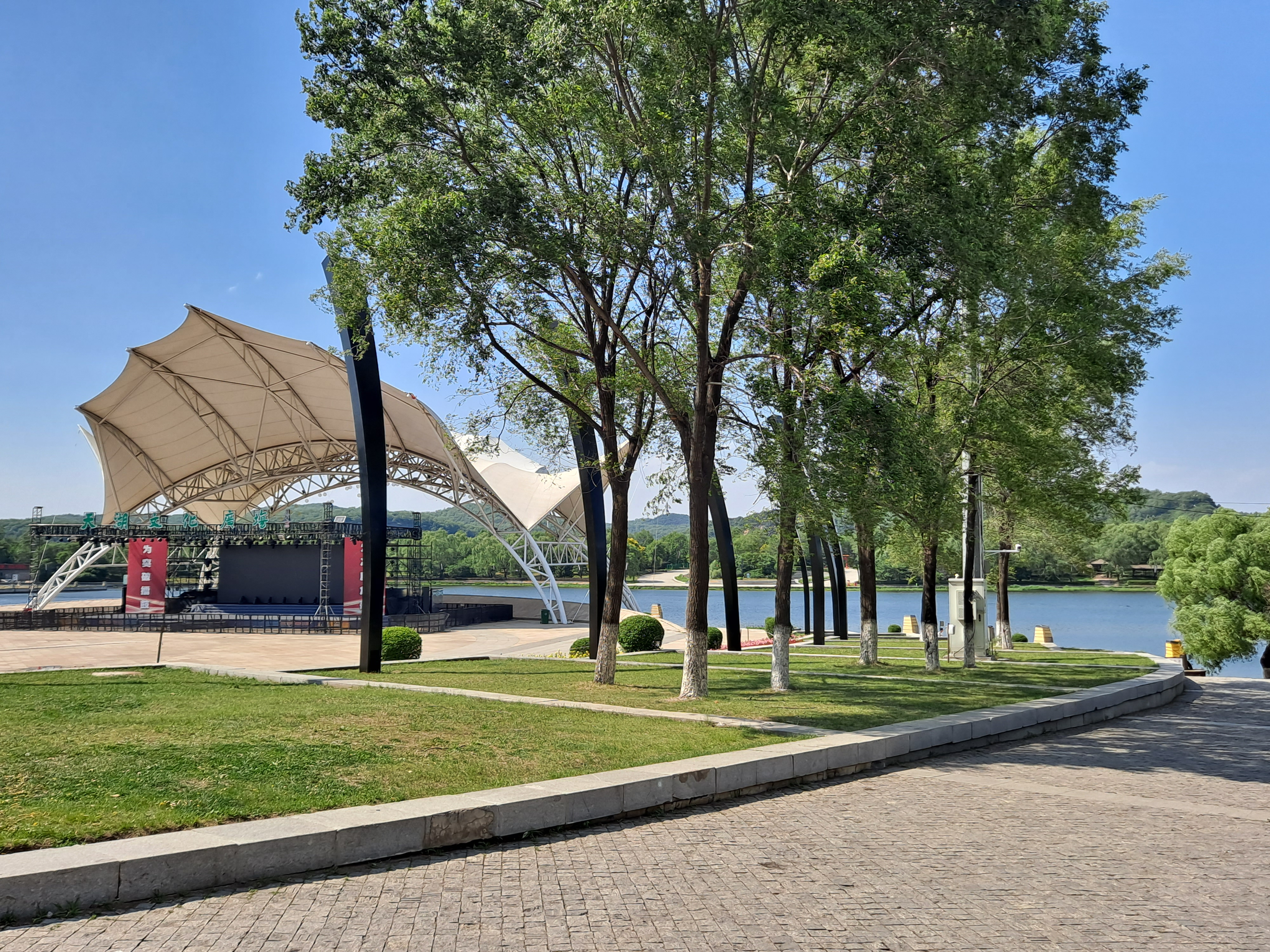
- Fushun City Skyline Downtown Fushun Pagoda Courtyard in Gaoshan Scenic Area Shenfu New District Ring of Life Lei Feng Road Fushun Shuncheng Wanda Plaza Crescent Island Ecological Park Fushun Skyline
- Interactive map of Fushun
- Location of the city center in Liaoning
- Coordinates (Fushun municipal government): 41°52′52″N 123°57′25″E
- Country: People's Republic of China
- Province: Liaoning
- Districts and counties: List: Shuncheng District; Xinfu District; Dongzhou District; Wanghua District; Fushun County; Xinbin Manchu Autonomous County; Qingyuan Manchu Autonomous County

Government
  - CPC Fushun: Committee Secretary

Area
  - Prefecture-level city: 11,272 km^{2} (4,352 sq mi)
  - Urban: 714 km^{2} (276 sq mi)
  - Metro: 4,222.2 km^{2} (1,630.2 sq mi)

Population (2020 census)
  - Prefecture-level city: 1,854,372
  - Density: 164.51/km^{2} (426.08/sq mi)
  - Urban: 1,322,098
  - Urban density: 1,850/km^{2} (4,800/sq mi)
  - Metro: 8,192,848
  - Metro density: 1,940.4/km^{2} (5,025.7/sq mi)

GDP
  - Prefecture-level city: CN¥ 95.5 billion US$ 13.8 billion
  - Per capita: CN¥ 58,555; US$ 9,401
- Time zone: UTC+8 (China Standard)
- Postal code: 113000
- Area code: 24
- ISO 3166 code: CN-LN-04
- Licence plates: 辽D
- Administrative division code: 210400
- Website: www.fushun.gov.cn www.fsgs.gov.cn

Fushun is a prefecture level city in Liaoning province, China, about 45 km (28 mi) east of Shenyang, with a total area of 11,272 km^{2} (4,352 sq mi), 714 km^{2} (276 sq mi) of which is the city proper. Situated on the Hun River ("muddy river"), it is one of the industrial and economic development hubs in Liaoning.

== History ==
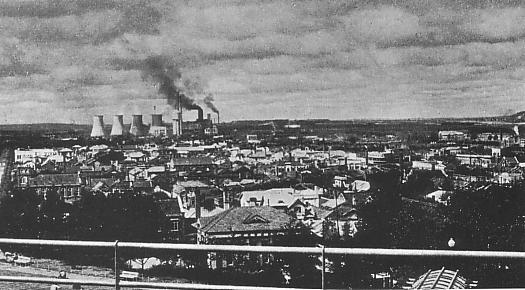
Fushun Industrial Area in 1940

The Ming first constructed Fushun walled city in 1384 after the division of the Yuan dynasty. "Fushun" is an abbreviation of the Chinese saying, "to pacify the frontiers; to guide the Yi" (撫綏邊疆，順導夷民).

The Jurchen (Manchu) leader Nurhachi married his granddaughter by his son Abatai to the Ming dynasty General Li Yongfang after Li surrendered Fushun in 1618 and defected to the Qing. One of Li Yongfang's descendants was sentenced to death by the Qianlong emperor, but his life was spared when he helped suppress the Lin Shuangwen rebellion.

Fushun was in ruins in the one-and-a-half centuries of early Qing. In 1783, the new walled city was completed southwest of the old city. In 1908, Fushun became the seat of Xingren County (興仁縣, later renamed to Fushun County). Fushun was occupied by Russia until 1905 and by Japan until 1945. With the Japanese victory over Imperial Russia and signing of the Treaty of Portsmouth, the South Manchuria branch (from Changchun to Lüshun) of the China Far East Railway was transferred to Japanese control. South Manchuria Railway Company quickly expanded the system inherited from Russia to staggering proportions. Coal mines were developed at Fushun. Under the control of the Japanese and with 30 years of development, Fushun area became highly industrialized. Fushun gained city status in 1937.

== Population ==
As of the 2020 census, Fushun has a total population of 1,854,372 people, whom 8,192,848 lived in the built-up (or metro) area encompassing 8 out of 10 Shenyang urban districts (all but Shenbei Xin and Liaozhong not being conurbated yet) and the 4 Fushun urban districts. This makes Shenyang-Fushun the 8th most populous built up area in China after the Pearl River Delta conurbation of Guangzhou, Shenzhen, Dongguan, Foshan, Jiangmen, Zhongshan and Huizhou, then Shanghai-Suzhou, Beijing, Tianjin, Hangzhou-Shaoxing, Wuhan and Nanjing.

== Administrative divisions ==
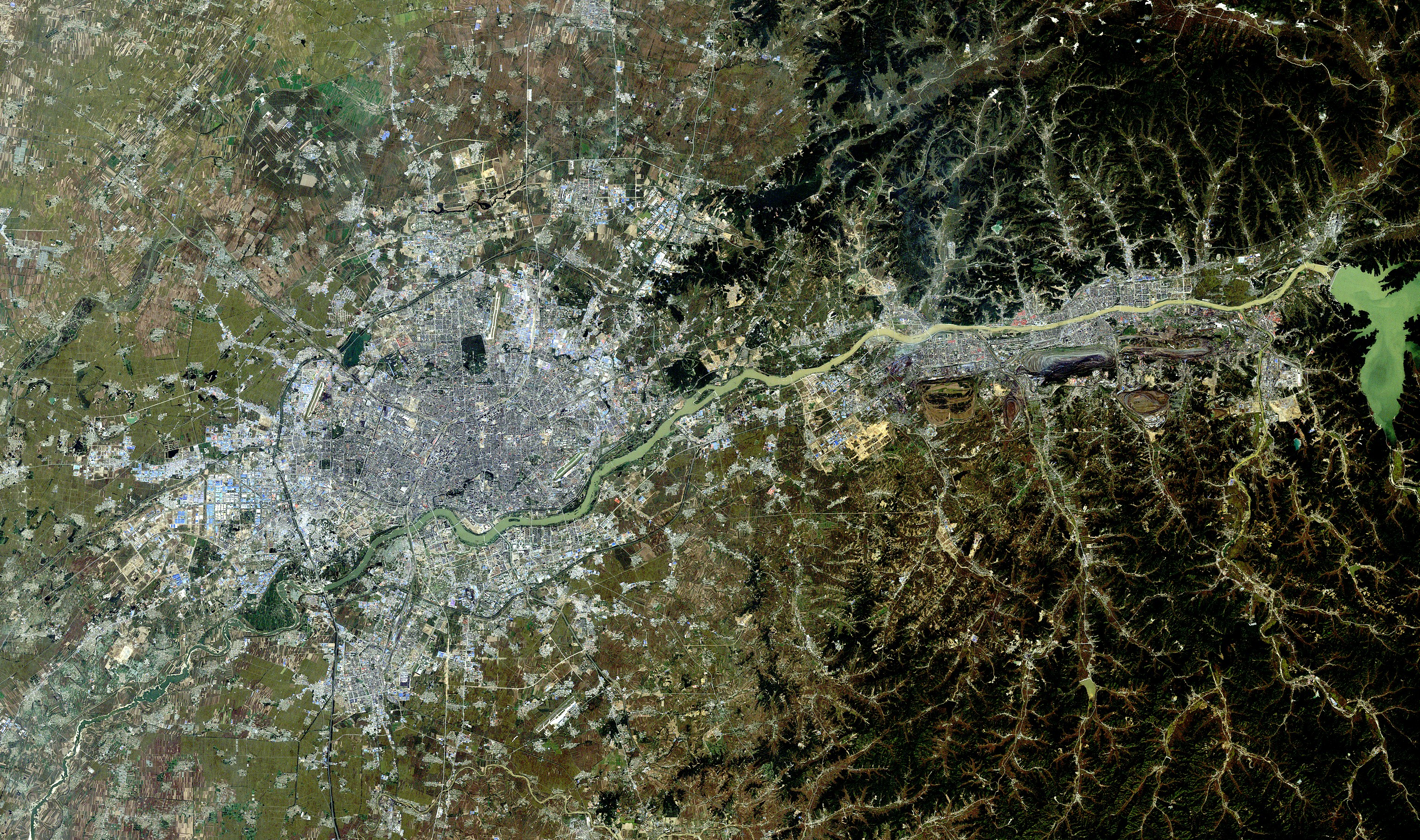
Satellite image of Shenyang-Fushun urban agglomeration (larger western part is Shenyang, eastern part is Fushun), Landsat 5, 2010-09-29.

Fushun consists of 4 districts, 1 county and 2 autonomous counties.

Map
#	Name	Chinese	Hanyu Pinyin	Population (2003 est.)	Area (km^{2})	Density (/km^{2})
1	Shuncheng District	顺城区	Shùnchéng Qū	472,920	379	1,248
2	Xinfu District	新抚区	Xīnfǔ Qū	252,631	110	2,297
3	Dongzhou District	东洲区	Dōngzhōu Qū	320,949	610	526
4	Wanghua District	望花区	Wànghuā Qū	384,514	317	1,213
5	Fushun County	抚顺县	Fǔshùn Xiàn	162,588	1,647	99
6	Xinbin Manchu; Autonomous County	新宾满族自治县	Xīnbīn Mǎnzú; Zìzhìxiàn	254,118	4,288	59
7	Qingyuan Manchu; Autonomous County	清原满族自治县	Qīngyuán Mǎnzú; Zìzhìxiàn	290,370	3,924	74

== Climate ==
Climate data for Fushun, elevation 119 m (390 ft), (1991–2020 normals, extremes 1951–present)
Month	Jan	Feb	Mar	Apr	May	Jun	Jul	Aug	Sep	Oct	Nov	Dec	Year
Record high °C (°F)	8.0 (46.4)	17.0 (62.6)	26.2 (79.2)	31.2 (88.2)	36.2 (97.2)	38.0 (100.4)	37.7 (99.9)	37.5 (99.5)	33.3 (91.9)	30.1 (86.2)	23.1 (73.6)	13.8 (56.8)	38.0 (100.4)
Mean daily maximum °C (°F)	−5.1 (22.8)	−0.2 (31.6)	7.2 (45.0)	16.9 (62.4)	23.6 (74.5)	27.4 (81.3)	29.3 (84.7)	28.4 (83.1)	24.2 (75.6)	16.3 (61.3)	5.6 (42.1)	−3.0 (26.6)	14.2 (57.6)
Daily mean °C (°F)	−13.4 (7.9)	−8.1 (17.4)	0.4 (32.7)	9.6 (49.3)	16.5 (61.7)	21.2 (70.2)	24.0 (75.2)	22.6 (72.7)	16.5 (61.7)	8.4 (47.1)	−1.1 (30.0)	−10.3 (13.5)	7.2 (44.9)
Mean daily minimum °C (°F)	−19.8 (−3.6)	−14.6 (5.7)	−5.7 (21.7)	2.3 (36.1)	9.3 (48.7)	15.3 (59.5)	19.5 (67.1)	18.1 (64.6)	10.4 (50.7)	2.1 (35.8)	−6.6 (20.1)	−16.1 (3.0)	1.2 (34.1)
Record low °C (°F)	−37.3 (−35.1)	−33.5 (−28.3)	−25.6 (−14.1)	−20.6 (−5.1)	−2.8 (27.0)	4.3 (39.7)	10.8 (51.4)	5.0 (41.0)	−3.5 (25.7)	−12.6 (9.3)	−23.9 (−11.0)	−33.7 (−28.7)	−37.3 (−35.1)
Average precipitation mm (inches)	6.7 (0.26)	11.1 (0.44)	18.2 (0.72)	38.8 (1.53)	65.2 (2.57)	107.6 (4.24)	201.3 (7.93)	187.5 (7.38)	52.5 (2.07)	49.1 (1.93)	26.4 (1.04)	13.5 (0.53)	777.9 (30.64)
Average precipitation days (≥ 0.1 mm)	4.4	4.4	5.6	7.4	9.5	12.8	13.7	12.5	7.7	7.5	6.2	5.7	97.4
Average snowy days	6.2	5.8	5.5	1.7	0	0	0	0	0	0.9	5.1	7.7	32.9
Average relative humidity (%)	68	63	57	52	59	70	80	83	77	70	68	70	68
Mean monthly sunshine hours	187.9	199.5	235.8	237.9	258.8	230.5	200.2	212.4	232.0	208.6	169.6	164.1	2,537.3
Percentage possible sunshine	64	66	63	59	57	51	44	50	63	62	58	58	58
Source: China Meteorological Administration

== Economy ==
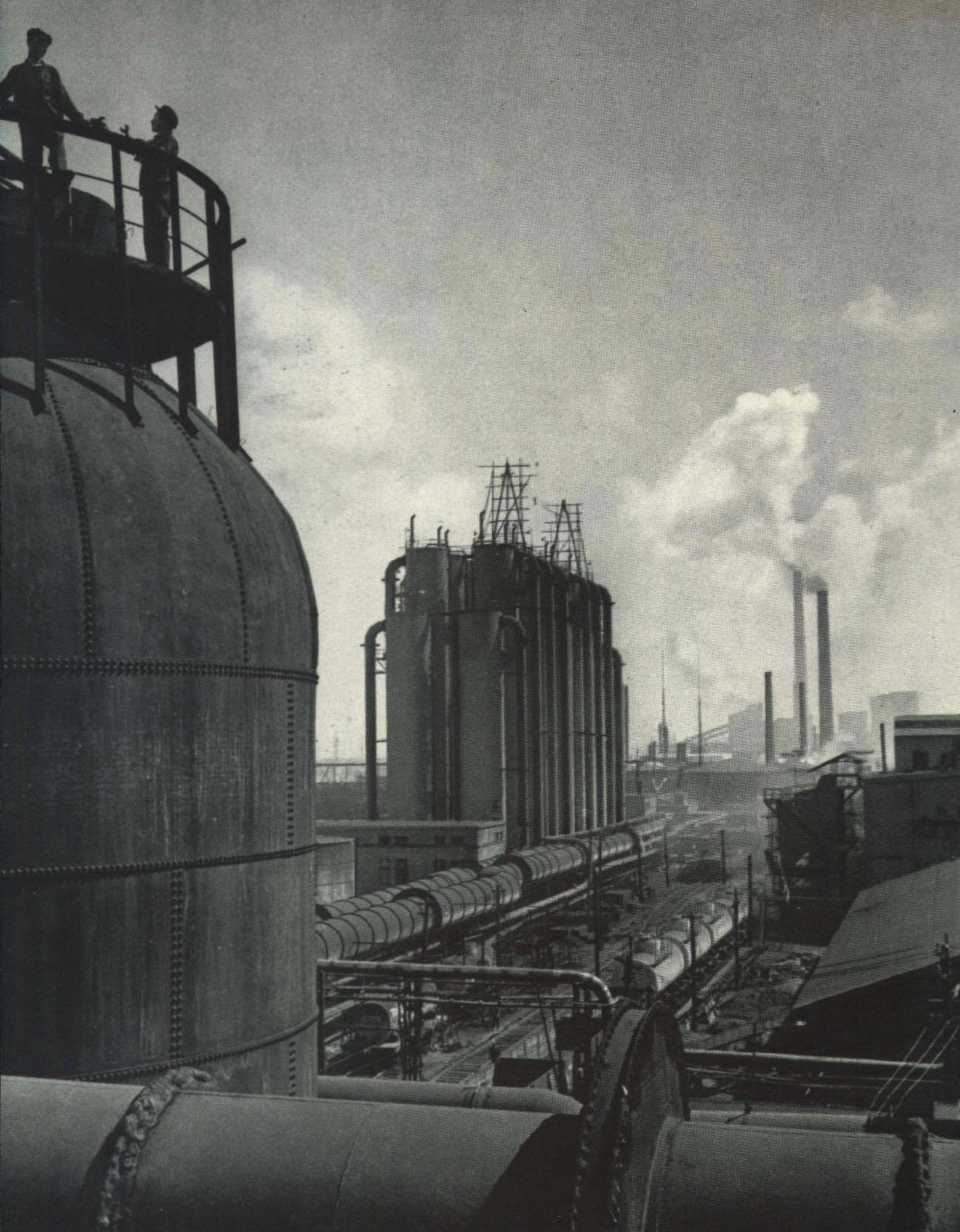
Fushun Oil Factory in 1963

Fushun is a highly industrialized area and nicknamed "the City of Coal". It has developed as a thriving center for fuel, power and raw materials and is also offering more and more opportunities in textiles and electronics. One of the world's largest open-pit coal mines, the West Open Mine, is located south of the city. Exploited from the 12th century, it was operated as an open pit mine during the 20th and early 21st centuries; however, as of 2015, the West Open pit, 1,000 feet deep, with an area of 4.2 square miles, was exhausted and unstable. Total coal production in Fushun as a whole had fallen below 3 million tons, down from 18.3 million tons in 1962. Fushun has a major aluminum-reduction plant and factories producing automobiles, machinery, chemicals, cement, and rubber.

The total GDP of the city of Fushun was 54.27 billion yuan in 2009 (ranked 4th out of the 58 cities and counties in Liaoning province). The GDP per capita of the city of Fushun was 40391 yuan in 2009 (ranked 21st out of all 58 cities and counties in Liaoning province).

=== Resources ===
Fushun is rich in wood, coal, oil shale, iron, copper, magnesium, gold, marble, titanium, and marl resources.

Fushun is known as "the capital of coal". The main coal and oil shale company is Fushun Mining Group, which produced about 6 million tons of coal in 2001, mainly blending coking coal and steam coal. The company also has coalbed methane resources of around 8.9 billion cubic meters. In addition, it owns geological reserves of high grade oil shale, about 3.5 billion tons, of which the exploitable reserve is 920 million tons.

=== Industrial development ===
Hydroelectric and thermal power are important locally available energy sources.

Fushun has developed through the utilization of the abundant natural mineral deposits found in the area and is a nationally important heavy industrial base for petroleum, chemical, metallurgy machinery and construction material industries. New sectors also becoming prominent are electronics, light industry, weaving and spinning.

In 1928, the commercial-scale production of shale oil began in Fushun with the construction of Fushun Coal Mine Temporary Oil Plant (Chinese: 撫順炭礦臨時製油工場; pinyin: Fǔshùn Tànkuàng Línshí Zhìyóu Gōngchǎng) of South Manchurian Railway, aka the Western Refinery (Chinese: 西制油; pinyin: Xī Zhìyóu), operating Fushun-type retorts. After World War II, shale oil production ceased, but 100 Fushun-type oil shale retorts and the related shale oil processing units were restored in 1949. In 1950, a total of 266 retorts were in operation, each with a capacity of 100–200 t (98–197 long tons; 110–220 short tons) of shale oil per day. In 1954, "Refinery No. 2" began production and in 1959 maximum annual shale oil production increased to 780,000 t (770,000 long tons; 860,000 short tons).

From 1965 oil shale usage in Fushun started to decline with the discovery of Da Qing oil field in the 1960s. Sinopec, a shale oil producer during those times, shut down its oil shale operations in the beginning of the 1990s. At the same time, the Fushun Oil Shale Retorting Plant was established as a part of the Fushun Mining Group. It started production in 1992. In the same year, the China National Oil Shale Association was established in Fushun.

At the end of 2006, the Fushun Mining Group operated the largest shale oil plant in the world, consisting of seven retorting units with 20 retorts in each unit, for a total 140 sets of Fushun type retorts.

There are also two oil refineries. Fushun Petrochemical Company, a subsidiary of PetroChina, is building a refining and petrochemical complex in Fushun.

== Transportation ==
Fushun is located 40 km (25 mi) from Shenyang Taoxian airport. Railways and highways connect the city to Shenyang and Jilin Province. The seaports of Dalian and Yingkou are also nearby, 400 and 200 km (250 and 120 mi) away respectively, with good railway and highway connections.

== Education ==
The highest-ranked institution of higher education is the Liaoning University of Petroleum and Chemical Technology, ranked 123rd in China overall. Fushun No.1 High School and Fushun No.2 High School are major high schools in Fushun.

The 44 middle school is located in the second street, Xin Fu District. Location is close to Fushun's CBD. Transport is very convenient. All students come from this community. Because of the population's decline in current years there are not many students compared to 10 years ago. There were over 1000 students in the 1990s, while now around 200 students. Although the number of students has dropped, the quality of education, the advanced learning facilities and modern school are still evident. There are indoors gymnasium, big dance and musical instrument rooms. The play yard is all about synthetic surface track. The 44 middle school is actually changed in term of their learning and teaching's facilities, equipment and school's building. It represents new outlooks regarding middle-level education in a third-line city in China.

== Tourism ==
Fushun has high mountains and thick woods. Houshi National Forest Park, about 55 km (34 mi) from downtown Fushun, is rated by the central government as an AAAA tourist attraction. Saer Hu Scenic Area covers some 268 km^{2} (103 sq mi). It includes the 110 km^{2} (42 sq mi) Dahuofang Reservoir, the largest man-made lake in northeast China.

There are a number of historic and cultural sites. Fushun's success in applying for two UNESCO World Heritage sites is expected to attract more tourists. They include a site known as Xingjing City, the origin of the Qing Dynasty, which is within today's Fushun. It was the first capital of the Late Jin dynasty, dating to 1616. The second site contains the Yongling tombs, where several members of the royal household are buried.

In more recent times, Fushun was where Lei Feng was stationed as a soldier and died, and a memorial museum telling his life story is a popular attraction. It is located at Wang Hua District in Fushun. It was also in Fushun that the last emperor, Puyi, was imprisoned after the end of World War II. The Fushun War Criminal Prison is converted into a museum in 1986. Another war memorial, the Pingdingshan Tragedy Memorial Hall Ruins, tells the story of a massacre of Chinese people by the Japanese in 1931. It was rebuilt and expanded in 2007. It includes a pit filled with about 800 bodies—largely infants, adults, and the elderly who were killed by the Japanese.

The Ring of Life monument opened in 2013 and features an observation deck overseeing the city. This circular tower, 515-foot (approximately 157 meters) tall, cost over $15 million to build. It is covered with 12,000 LED lights.

== Sports ==
The city used to be home of the Chinese Super League (soccer) team of Liaoning FC at Leifeng Stadium. However, when the team could not afford the rent at Leifeng Stadium it moved to Beijing, where it now plays out of Chaolai Soccer Base.

== Notable figures ==
- Nurhachi, the first Manchu ruler, was born in today's Xinbin Manchu Autonomous County.
- Lei Feng, who was a soldier enshrined in new China history after 1949, died in this city. There is a memorial park named after him in Fushun's Wanghua District.
- Yoshiko Yamaguchi was a famous Fushun-born ethnic Japanese singer and movie star in China during the 1930s and 1940s.
- Wang Nan, famous table-tennis sportswoman, who has won many gold medals around the world.
- Puyi, the last Emperor of China, spent ten years in the Fushun War Criminal Prison.
- Liu Ce, sanda fighter and professional kickboxer, K-1 Cruiserweight champion and K-1 30th Anniversary Openweight Grand Prix Winner.
- Dong Yuyu, a journalist arrested by Chinese authorities in 2022 on charges of espionage, was born in Fushun in 1962.

== Sister cities ==
=== International ===
- Lipa City, Batangas, Philippines
- Yubari, Hokkaido, Japan
