= Taiyang Subdistrict =

Taiyang Subdistrict 太阳街道
- Township-level division
- Location in Liaoning
- Coordinates: 39°44′30″N 121°52′3″E
- Country: China
- Province: Liaoning
- Prefecture: Dalian
- County: Wafangdian
- Time zone: UTC+8 (China Standard)
- Postal code: 116323

Taiyang Subdistrict (Chinese: 太阳街道) is a subdistrict of Wafangdian, Dalian District, Liaoning, China. It is based around the small town of Taiyang, Taiyangsheng or Taiyangshengxiang, which lies 19 kilometres east by road of Fuzhou, 64 kilometres north by road from Pulandian. To the east is the DFM reservoir.

== See also ==
- List of township-level divisions of Liaoning
