= Xizhong Island =

Island in the Bohai Sea, China

Native name: 西中岛
- Interactive map of Xizhong Island

Geography
- Location: Bohai Sea
- Coordinates: 39°26′5″N 121°18′11″E
- Area: 47 km^{2} (18 sq mi)

Administration
- China
- Province: Liaoning
- Division: Dalian
- City: Wafangdian

Xizhong Island (simplified Chinese: 西中岛; traditional Chinese: 西中島; pinyin: Xizhōng Dǎo) is a major island located in the Bohai Sea, in the province of Liaoning, Northeast China.

Xizhong Island is one of a group of islands located at the tip of the Liaodong Peninsula: Changxing Island lies to the north and Fengming Island to the south. The island is part of the Wafangdian district in the city of Dalian.
