= Fengming Island =

Chinese Island

Native name: 凤鸣岛
- Interactive map of Fengming Island

Geography
- Location: Bohai Sea
- Coordinates: 39°23′53″N 121°23′28″E

Administration
- China
- Province: Liaoning
- Division: Dalian
- City: Wafangdian

Fengming Island (simplified Chinese: 凤鸣岛; traditional Chinese: 鳳鳴島; pinyin: Fèngmíng Dǎo) is a major island located in the Bohai Sea, in the province of Liaoning, Northeast China.

Fengming Island is one of a group of islands located at the tip of the Liaodong Peninsula: Changxing Island and Xizhong Island lie to the north. The island is part of the Wafangdian district in the city of Dalian.
