= Jiaoliudao Subdistrict =

Jiaoliudao subdistrict 交流岛街道
- Town
- Interactive map of Jiaoliudao subdistrict
- Coordinates: 39.4400°N 121.4086°E
- Country: People's Republic of China
- Province: Liaoning
- Sub-provincial city: Dalian
- County-level city: Wafangdian

Jiaoliudao (simplified Chinese: 交流岛街道; traditional Chinese: 交流島街道; pinyin: Jiāoliúdǎo Jiēdào) is a subdistrict of Wafangdian city, Liaoning, China, it is located on the Bohai Bay in the southwest of the city. The subdistrict covers 97 km^{2} (37 sq mi) with a population of 16.5 thousand. Jiaoliudao is surrounded by the sea, and has an industry of well-developed seawater aquaculture. The place is one of seafood breeding bases in Dalian or Liaoning, and it was honoured as the "famous producing area of clams" in China (中国沙蚬子之乡).

Jiaoliudao was originally a township. On May 24, 2007, it was entrusted to govern by the management committee of Changxing Island Economic and Technological Development Zone. On January 2, 2008, the township was changed to a subdistrict, which is the other type of township-level division.

== See also ==
- List of township-level divisions of Liaoning
