= Datan =

Datan may refer to:

- Datan, Hebei (大滩镇), China
- Datan, Liaoning (大谭镇), in Pulandian, Liaoning, China
- An alternative spelling of the biblical figure Dathan
