= Fuzhoucheng =

Fuzhoucheng 复州城镇 Fuchow
- Town
- Location in Liaoning
- Coordinates: 39°44′00″N 121°42′37″E
- Country: China
- Province: Liaoning
- Sub-provincial city: Dalian
- County-level city: Wafangdian
- Village-level divisions: 2 residential communities 14 villages
- Elevation: 18 m (59 ft)
- Time zone: UTC+8 (China Standard)

Fuzhou, also Fuzhoucheng (simplified Chinese: 复州城; traditional Chinese: 復州城; pinyin: Fùzhōuchéng) is a town under the administration of Wafangdian City, in southern Liaoning province, China. It lies at the intersection of China National Highway 202 and Liaoning Provincial Highway 313, 57 kilometres (35 mi) north by road from Pulandian. Dahe Reservoir is located several kilometres to the east. There is a 74,132 acres (30,000 hectares) bird reserve nearby with species such as Swan goose and Hooded crane about 15 km (9.3 mi) southwest of the town. As of 2011, it has 2 residential communities (社区) and 14 villages under its administration.

== Notable people ==
- Mou Weixin, politician, a member of the Provincial Assembly for Fuzhou in early 20th century.

== See also ==
- List of township-level divisions of Liaoning
