= Yandian Township, Liaoning =

Yandian Township 阎店乡
- Township
- Location in Liaoning
- Coordinates: 39°50′22″N 121°49′58″E
- Country: China
- Province: Liaoning
- Sub-provincial city: Dalian
- County-level city: Wafangdian
- Village-level divisions: 7 villages
- Elevation: 43 m (141 ft)
- Time zone: UTC+8 (China Standard)
- Area code: 0411

Yandian Township (simplified Chinese: 阎店乡; traditional Chinese: 閻店鄉; pinyin: Yándiàn Xiāng) is a township under the administration of Wafangdian City in southern Liaoning province, China, located about 27 kilometres (17 mi) northwest of downtown Wafangdian, 102 km (63 mi) north of Dalian, and served directly by China National Highway 202. As of 2011, it has 7 villages under its administration.

== See also ==
- List of township-level divisions of Liaoning
