= Yongning, Liaoning =

Yongning 永宁镇
- Town
- Location in Liaoning
- Coordinates: 39°55′10″N 121°53′12″E
- Country: People's Republic of China
- Province: Liaoning
- Prefecture-level city: Dalian
- County-level city: Wafangdian
- Time zone: UTC+8 (China Standard)

Yongning (simplified Chinese: 永宁; traditional Chinese: 永寧; pinyin: Yǒngníng) is a town under the administration of Wafangdian, Liaoning, China. As of 2018, it has 18 villages under its administration.

== See also ==
- List of township-level divisions of Liaoning
