= Zhuanghe =

Zhuanghe 庄河市 Chwangho
- County-level city
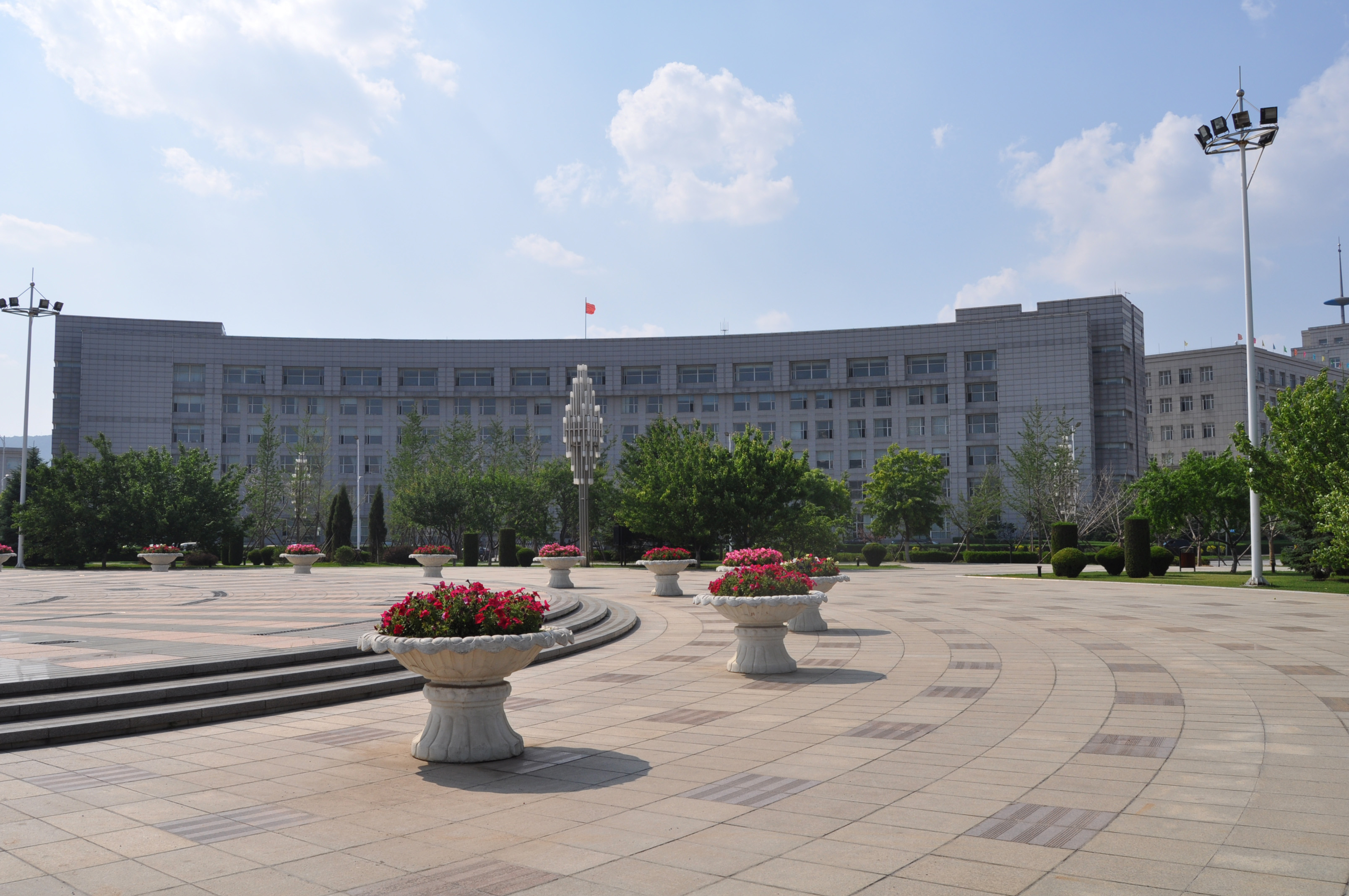
- Zhuanghe City Government, Xinhua Square

- Location in Liaoning
- Coordinates (Zhuanghe government): 39°40′52″N 122°58′01″E
- Country: People's Republic of China
- Province: Liaoning
- Sub-provincial city: Dalian
- Seat: No. 1 Century Square (世纪广场1号)

Area
  - County-level city: 3,655.70 km^{2} (1,411.47 sq mi)
  - Urban: 239.00 km^{2} (92.28 sq mi)

Population (2020)
  - County-level city: 742,496
  - Density: 203.106/km^{2} (526.043/sq mi)
  - Urban: 348,028
- Time zone: UTC+8 (China Standard)
- Postal code: 116400
- Division code: 210283
- Website: www.dlzh.gov.cn

Zhuanghe
- Simplified Chinese: 庄河
- Traditional Chinese: 莊河
- Postal: Chwangho
Transcriptions
Standard Mandarin
- Hanyu Pinyin: Zhuānghé
- Wade–Giles: Chuang^{1}-ho^{2}

Zhuanghe (simplified Chinese: 庄河; traditional Chinese: 莊河; pinyin: Zhuānghé) is one of the two "northern county-level cities", the other being Wafangdian, under the administration of Dalian, located in the south of Liaoning province, People's Republic of China. Its area is 3,655.70 square kilometres (1,411.47 sq mi) and its permanent population as of 2020 is 742,496, making it Dalian's most spacious county-level division.

== Geography and climate ==
Zhuanghe occupies the northeastern corner of Dalian City on the Liaodong Peninsula, with latitude ranging from 39° 25' to 40° 12' N and longitude ranging from 122° 29' to 123° 31' E. It covers an area of 6,968 square kilometres (2,690 sq mi), 4,073 km^{2} (1,573 sq mi) of which is land; the natural coastline measures 285 km (177 mi). It borders Donggang City to the east, Pulandian City to the west, Gaizhou City and Xiuyan Manchu Autonomous County to the north, and Changhai County in the Yellow Sea to the south. Elevations increase from south to north, with the northern part of the city being part of the southern Qian Mountains; the highest elevation in Zhuanghe City is 1,130.7 m (3,710 ft).

Zhuanghe has a monsoon-influenced humid continental climate (Köppen Dwa), with long, cold, but dry winters, and humid and very warm summers. Due to the location on the Liaodong Peninsula, there is a seasonal delay in spring and summer, and extremes in heat are moderated; however, low temperatures peak in July. The monthly 24-hour average temperature ranges from −7.3 °C (18.9 °F) in January to 23.7 °C (74.7 °F) in August, and the annual mean is 9.3 °C (48.7 °F). Precipitation is generous but a majority of the annual total falls in July and Average. There is an average 2,415.6 hours of bright sunshine annually, and the frost-free period averages 165 days. Extremes in temperature range from −28.1 °C (−19 °F) to 37.7 °C (100 °F).

Climate data for Zhuanghe, elevation 35 m (115 ft), (1991–2020 normals, extremes 1971–2018)
Month	Jan	Feb	Mar	Apr	May	Jun	Jul	Aug	Sep	Oct	Nov	Dec	Year
Record high °C (°F)	10.0 (50.0)	12.4 (54.3)	19.3 (66.7)	29.3 (84.7)	31.2 (88.2)	36.0 (96.8)	35.0 (95.0)	37.7 (99.9)	34.3 (93.7)	28.1 (82.6)	18.9 (66.0)	12.0 (53.6)	37.7 (99.9)
Mean daily maximum °C (°F)	−0.9 (30.4)	2.1 (35.8)	7.6 (45.7)	14.8 (58.6)	20.7 (69.3)	24.1 (75.4)	27.0 (80.6)	28.1 (82.6)	24.6 (76.3)	17.7 (63.9)	8.6 (47.5)	0.7 (33.3)	14.6 (58.3)
Daily mean °C (°F)	−6.9 (19.6)	−3.6 (25.5)	2.4 (36.3)	9.6 (49.3)	15.8 (60.4)	20.1 (68.2)	23.6 (74.5)	24.0 (75.2)	19.2 (66.6)	11.7 (53.1)	3.2 (37.8)	−4.6 (23.7)	9.5 (49.2)
Mean daily minimum °C (°F)	−11.8 (10.8)	−8.3 (17.1)	−2.1 (28.2)	4.9 (40.8)	11.2 (52.2)	16.6 (61.9)	20.7 (69.3)	20.4 (68.7)	14.2 (57.6)	6.4 (43.5)	−1.4 (29.5)	−8.9 (16.0)	5.2 (41.3)
Record low °C (°F)	−28.1 (−18.6)	−25.2 (−13.4)	−12.1 (10.2)	−5.2 (22.6)	3.3 (37.9)	9.0 (48.2)	14.4 (57.9)	9.7 (49.5)	2.7 (36.9)	−5.8 (21.6)	−14.2 (6.4)	−23.4 (−10.1)	−28.1 (−18.6)
Average precipitation mm (inches)	5.0 (0.20)	10.0 (0.39)	15.9 (0.63)	39.6 (1.56)	69.9 (2.75)	94.5 (3.72)	163.6 (6.44)	193.1 (7.60)	68.0 (2.68)	36.9 (1.45)	29.0 (1.14)	10.2 (0.40)	735.7 (28.96)
Average precipitation days (≥ 0.1 mm)	3.1	3.2	4.5	6.7	8.2	10.9	14.6	11.4	7.1	5.7	5.2	3.0	83.6
Average snowy days	3.9	3.4	2.0	0.5	0	0	0	0	0	0	1.9	3.8	15.5
Average relative humidity (%)	56	57	59	62	68	80	86	84	75	68	63	60	68
Mean monthly sunshine hours	207.8	196.3	238.1	239.4	256.3	207.6	175.9	212.7	235.4	217.3	175.1	184.6	2,546.5
Percentage possible sunshine	69	64	64	60	58	47	39	51	64	64	59	64	59
Source 1: China Meteorological Administrationall-time extreme temperature
Source 2: Weather China

== Administrative divisions ==
There are 5 subdistricts, 15 towns, 4 townships, and 2 ethnic townships under the city's administration:

=== Subdistricts ===
- Chengguan Subdistrict (城关街道)
- Xinhua Subdistrict (新华街道)
- Xingda Subdistrict (兴达街道)
- Changsheng Subdistrict (昌盛街道)
- Mingyang Subdistrict (明阳街道)

=== Towns ===
- Qingdui (青堆镇)
- Xuling (徐岭镇)
- Heidao (黑岛镇)
- Lizifang (栗子房镇)
- Daying (大营镇)
- Taling (塔岭镇)
- Xianrendong (仙人洞镇)
- Ronghuashan (蓉花山镇)
- Changling (长岭镇)
- Hehuashan (荷花山镇)
- Chengshan (城山镇)
- Guangmingshan (光明山镇)
- Dazheng (大郑镇)
- Wulu (吴炉镇)
- Wangjia (王家镇)

=== Townships ===
- Anzishan Township (鞍子山乡)
- Buyunshan Township (步云山乡)
- Landian Township (兰店乡)
- Shicheng Township (Shihcheng) (石城乡)

=== Ethnic Townships ===
- Taipingling Manchu Ethnic Township (太平岭满族乡)
- Guiyunhua Manchu Ethnic Township (桂云花满族乡)

== Demography ==
Zhuanghe has a population of over 900,000 and its area is 3,866 km^{2} (1,493 sq mi).

== Transportation ==
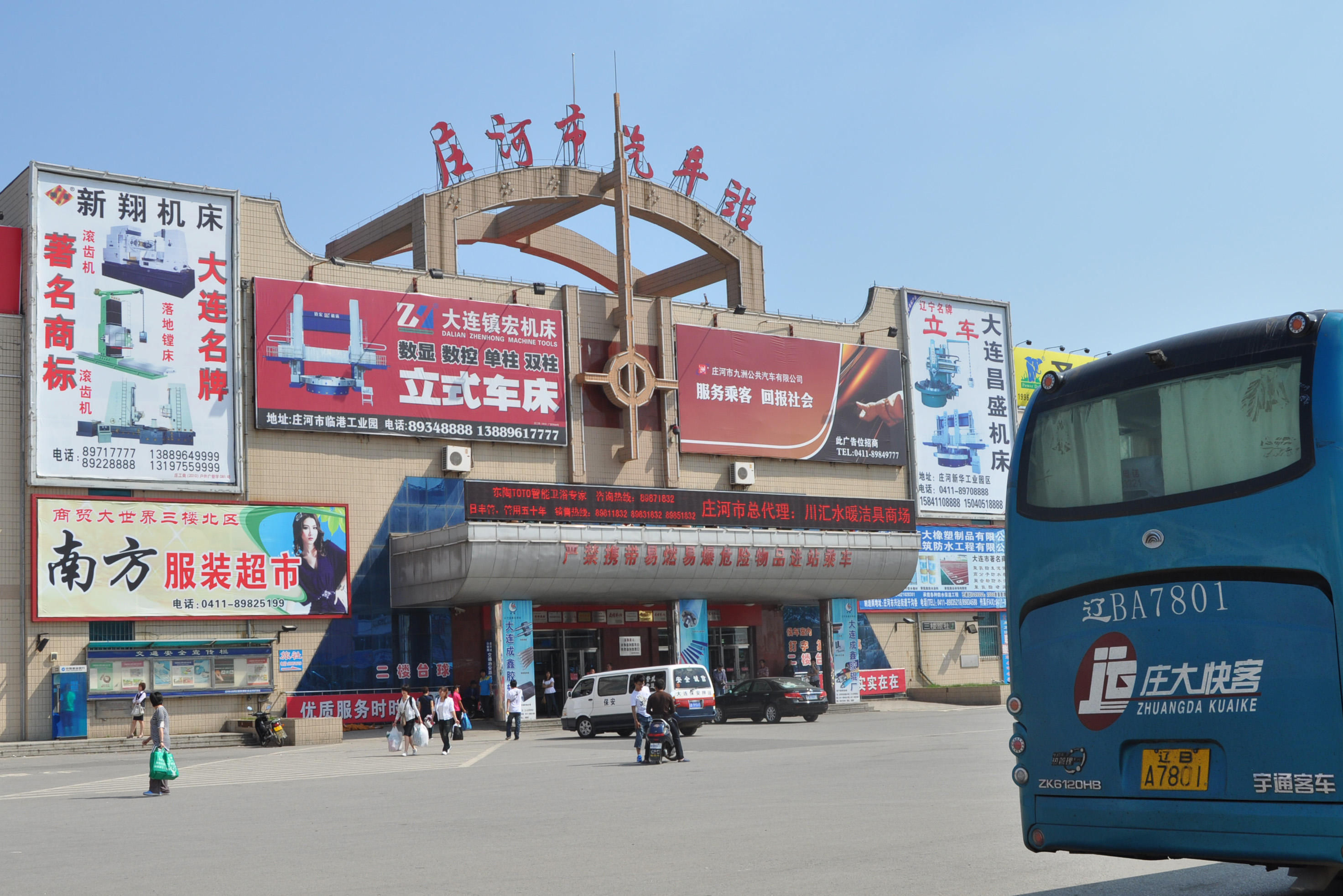
Zhuanghe Bus Station and a Dalian−Zhuanghe Bus

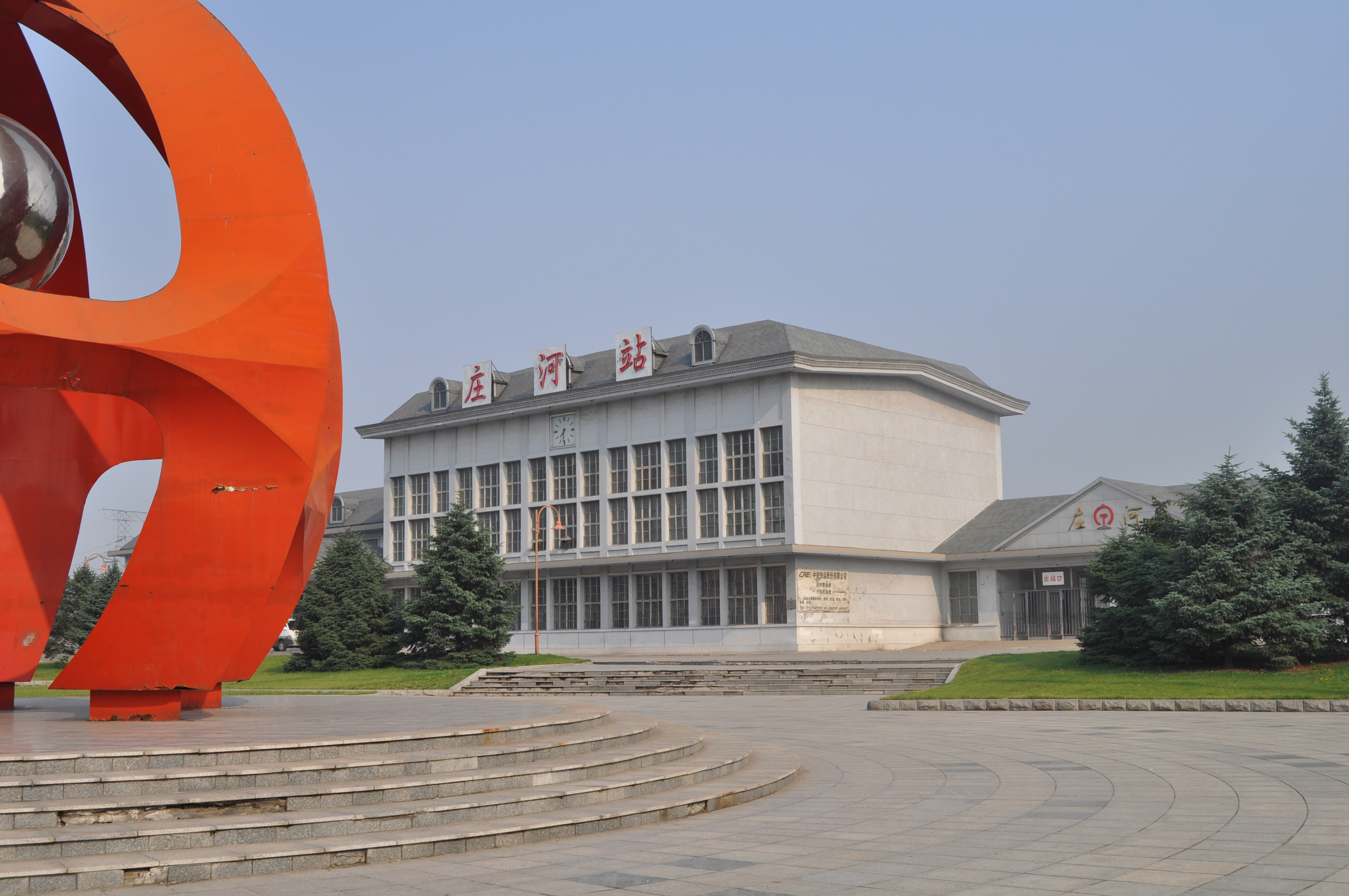
Zhuanghe Railway Station and Its Plaza

- Zhuanghe Bus Station
- Zhuanghe Railway Station
- Zhuanghe Port
- China National Highway 201, running parallel to G15 and through downtown
- China National Highway 305, of which Zhuanghe is the terminus, provides access to the interior of the Liaodong Peninsula, Yingkou, and points beyond before terminating at Linxi, Inner Mongolia.
- G11 Hegang–Dalian Expressway, the main road to central Dalian, passing to the north of downtown

== Economy ==
A base of the national commodity grain, Zhuanghe has very abundant agricultural and natural resources. Besides, it is one of the most important fruit bases in eastern Liaodong Peninsula. The Port of Zhuanghe is under construction.

Zhuanghe is also increasingly promoting its furniture manufacturing industry. The Huafeng Furniture Manufacturing Company has been one of the largest furniture manufacturing companies all over the country.

The Huayuankou Industrial Zone in the westernmost part of Zhuanghe City is one of "Five Points, One Line" projects of the province.

== Sightseeing ==
The tourism has gradually developed to be rising support structure in the county.

- Chengshan Ancient Town (城山古城)
- Bingyu Valley (冰峪沟): Guilin of northern China
- Yinshitan National Forest Park (银石滩国家森林公园)
- Buyun Mountain (步云山), the highest peak in Dalian, at 1,130 metres (3,710 ft) above sea level, and Buyun Mountain Hot Spring
- Sea King Nine Islands (海王九岛)
- Xianrendong National Nature Reserve (仙人洞国家级自然保护区)

== Gallery ==
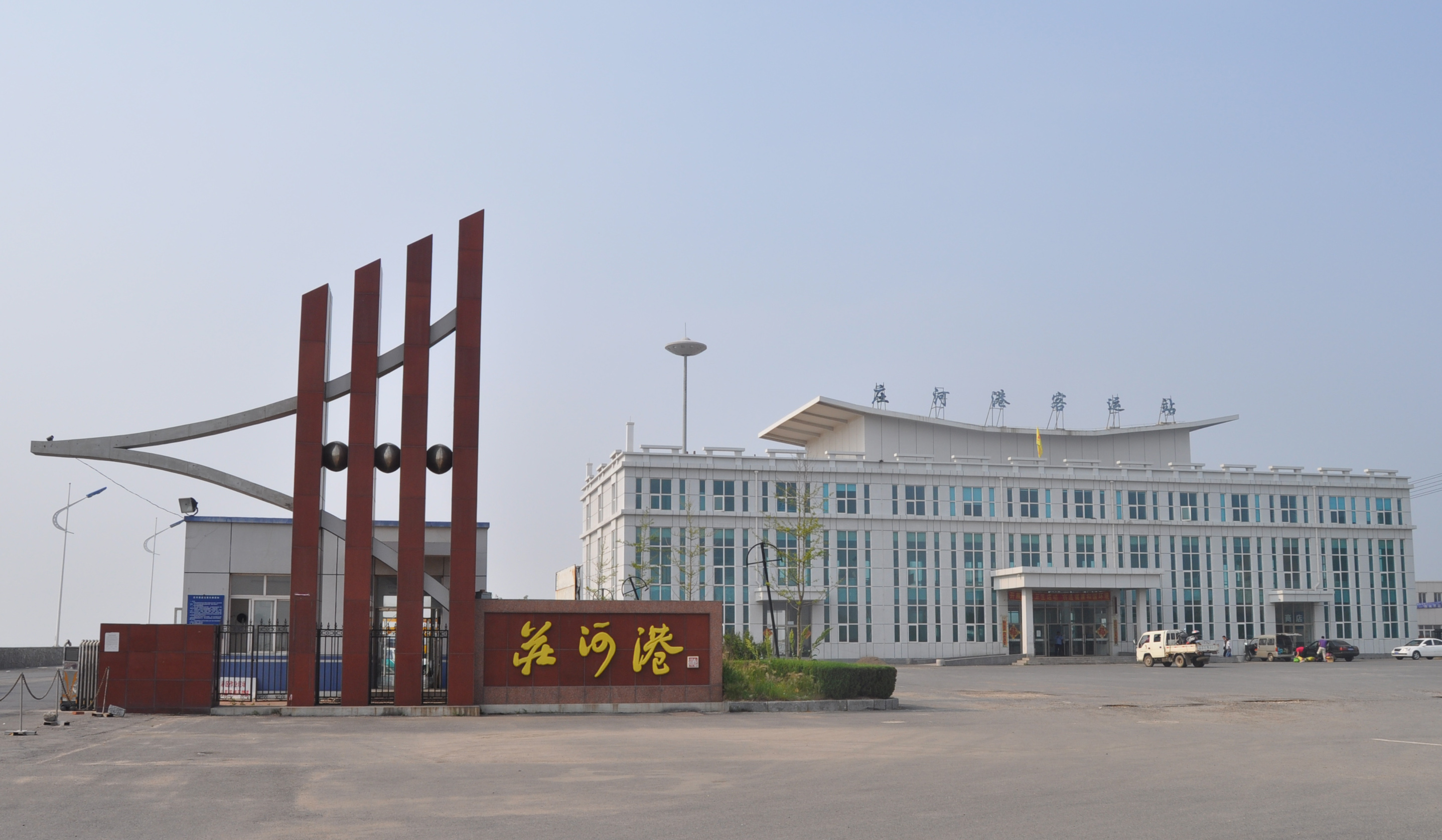
Zhuanghe Port

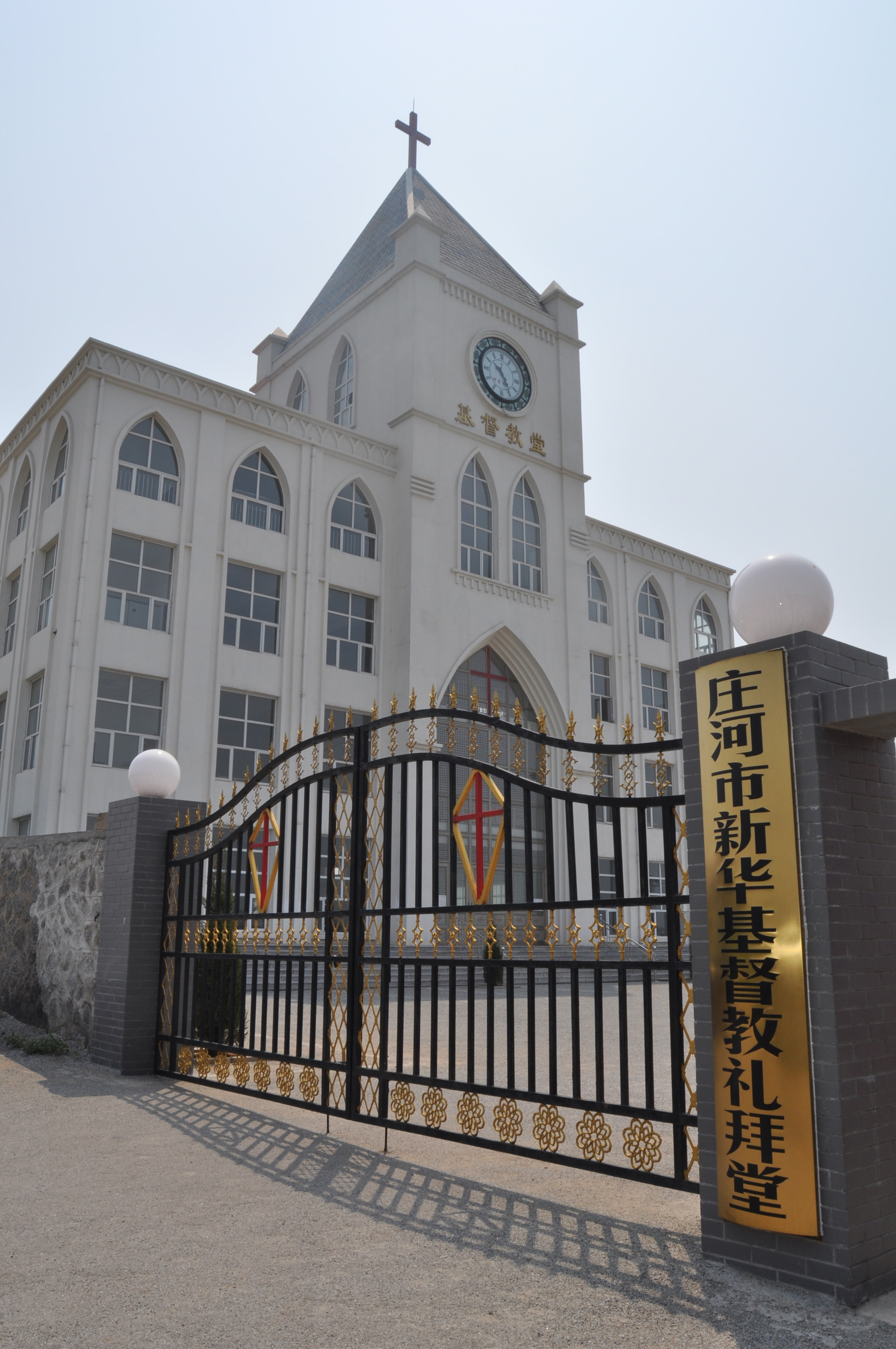
Zhuanghe City Xinhua Christian Church

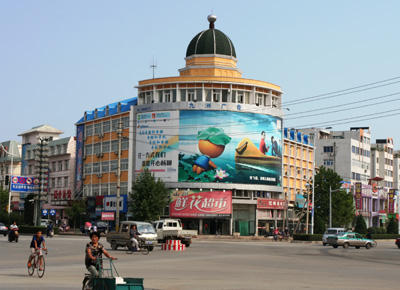
Downtown Zhuanghe on Huanghe Avenue at Xinhua (2007)
