= Bingyu Valley =

Coordinates: 40°00′0″N 122°57′01″E

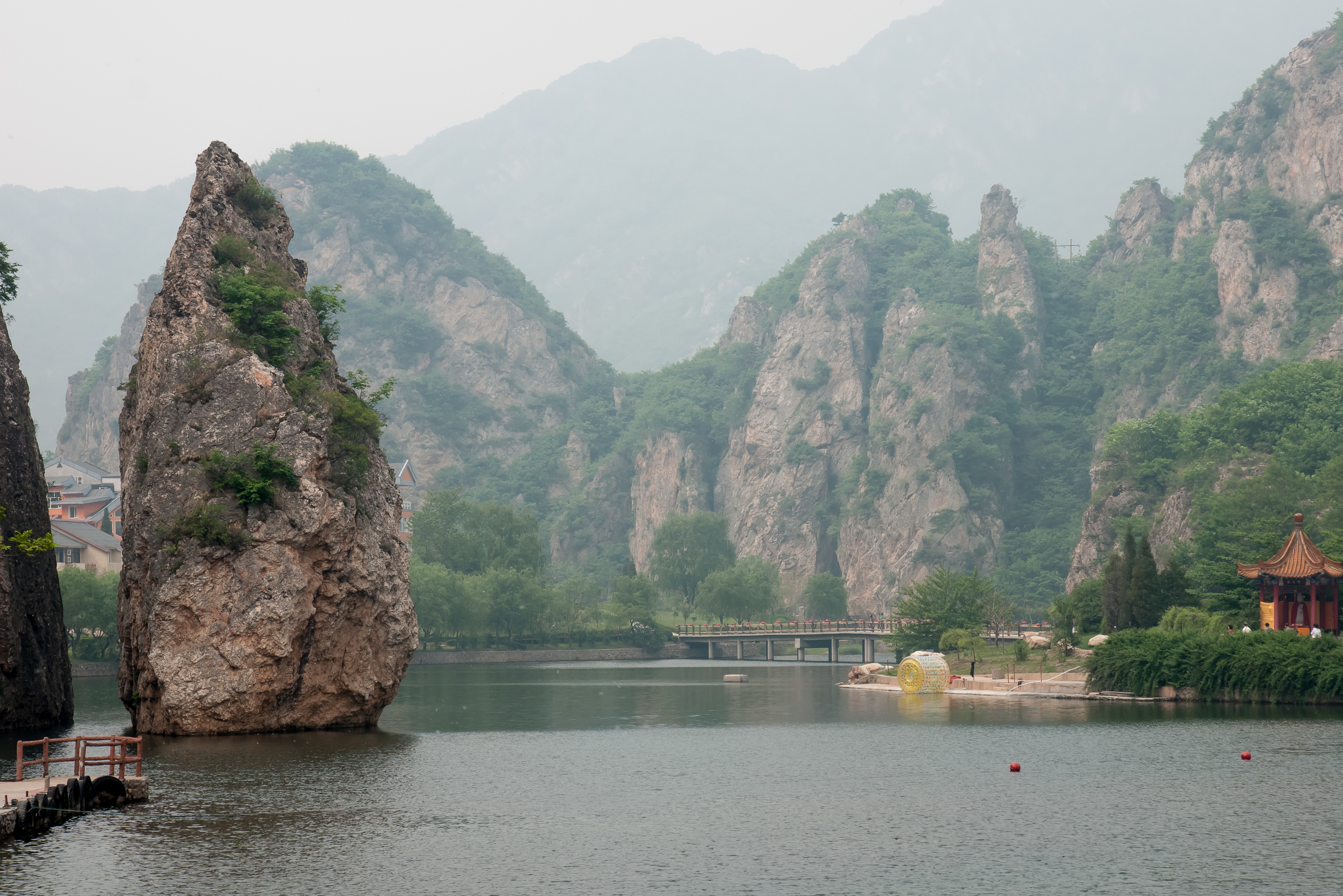
Bingyu Valley in Zhuanghe, Dalian, Liaoning

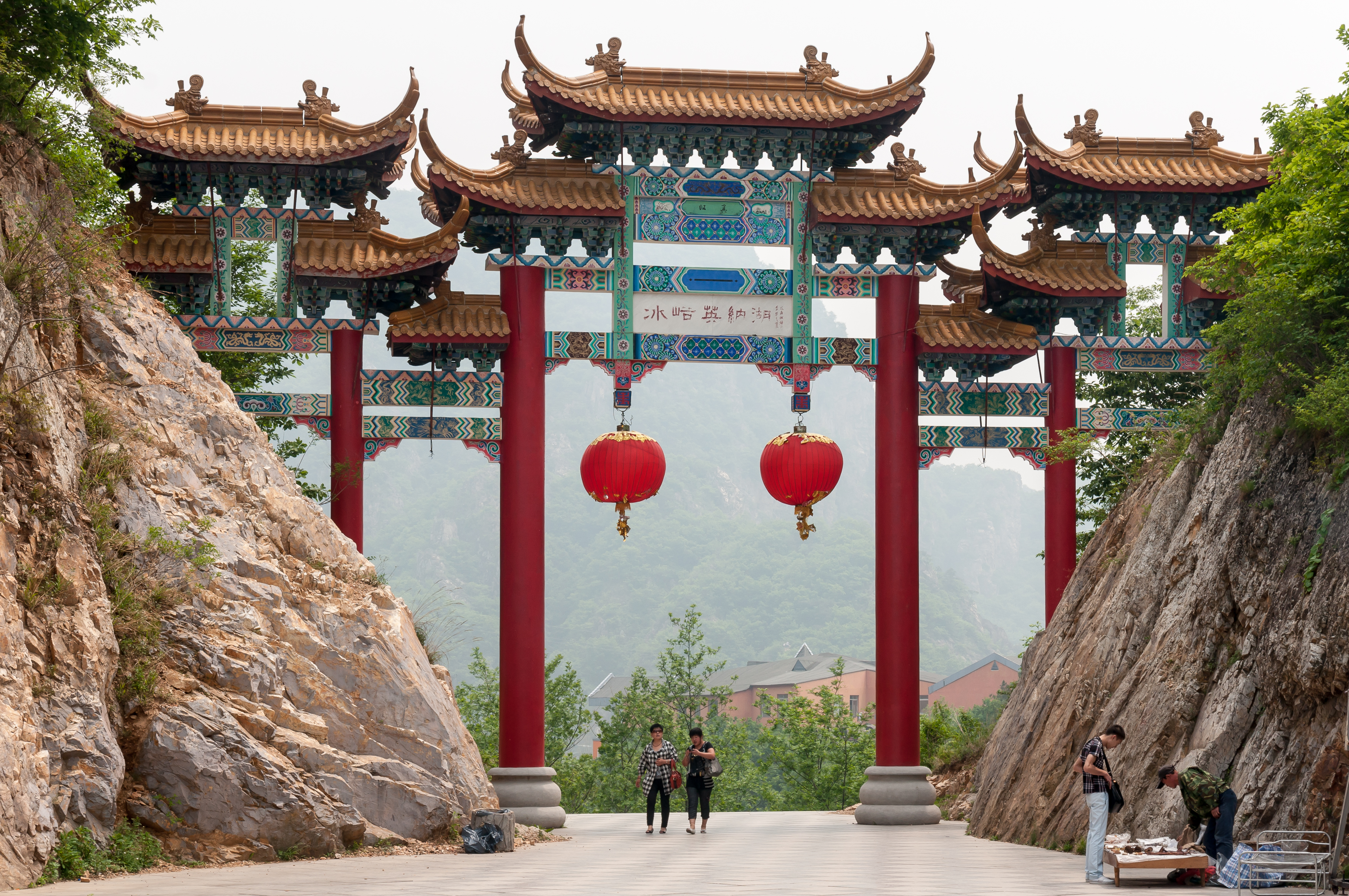
The entrance to the Yingna River Dam area, Bingyu Valley

Bingyu Valley (Chinese: 冰峪沟) is a relatively new tourist destination from the 1980s, located in the mountains of Zhuanghe in Dalian, Liaoning Province, China.

== Overview ==
Bingyu Valley is a tourist destination with abundant nature that straddles the gorge near the confluence with the Xiaoyu River in the upper reaches of the Yingna River that flows through Zhuanghe, Dalian, Liaoning Province. It is also called "Southern Liaoning Guilin" or "Dongbei Jiuzhaigou" because of its beautiful valley. With an area of 170 square kilometers, it is now a national-level Geopark as well as a 4A Tourist Attraction of China.

Boating on the Yingnahe Dam Lake, built in 1974, which is the main source of downtown Dalian's water supply, and hiking in the surrounding mountains are the major attractions.

=== 2017 flood damage ===
The valley was severely damaged by the heavy rain in northeastern China in August 2017, and a visitor to the valley in June 2019 reported that the restoration had not been completed yet. It will take a few more years to return to the normal conditions.

== See also ==
- Tourist attractions in Zhuanghe
- Guilin in Guangxi Zhuang Autonomous Region, China
- Jiuzhaigou in Sichuan Province, China
