= Dalian Yinshitan Forest National Park =

National park in Liaoning, China

Coordinates: 38°55′N 121°38′E

Dalian Yinshitan Forest National Park (Chinese: 大连银石滩国家森林公园; pinyin: Dàlián yínshítān guójiā sēnlín gōngyuán; lit. 'Dalian Silver Pebble Beach Forest National Park') is a national park located in the proximity of Dalian, Liaoning province, China. It is also known simply as (Chinese: 银石滩; pinyin: yínshítān; lit. 'Silver Pebble Beach').

== Location ==
The national park is surrounded by mountains and many small rivers. Giant silver rocks and waterfalls surrounds the park. It is located approximately 200 kilometers from the coastal city of Dalian and 25 km from Zhuanghe (South of Dalian). A recently constructed rail service called "Yellow Sea Express" shortens the traveling time to two hours from Dalian.

== History ==
The national park was established in October 2005, (Chinese: 银石滩; lit. 'Silver Pebble Beach') was formally named Dalian Yinshitan Forest National Park. The park was the first to allow individuals to contribute to the ecological protection and exploration of the area. This is done by donations from tourist to a specific area in the park to fund conservation objectives.

The highest mountain in the park is called the Xiema Peak (literally "Tying Horse Mountain"), dates back to the era of the Tang dynasty. There was a war between the Chinese army and the Korean empire near Xiema Peak. The Chinese General Xue Rengui (Chinese: 薛仁贵) observed the landforms in advance of the war, he climbed the highest mountain and tied his horse to a big rock. The Koreans were defeated in the battle. The general Xue Rengui became famous for this victory and eventually became the name of the mountain ever since.

== Name origin ==
Dalian Yinshitan Forest National Park or abbreviation (Chinese: 银石滩; pinyin: yínshítān; lit. 'Silver Pebble Beach') got its name from the giant rocks with vivid shapes. According to textual research from the Geologic Department of Beijing University, the mountains were formed by violent debris that happened 500 million years ago then followed by a landform of ancient debris flow. The mountains' shapes supposedly reminded of different animals such as a lying horse, a turtle climbing a mountain.

== Geography ==
There are nine valleys among the mountains; the longest valley (Dawan Valley) stretches 13 kilometers. Along the valleys there are several streams that form different lakes.

Dalian Yinshitan Forest National Park is known for its big rocks and many plants, but is also famous for its waterfalls. Since Silver Stone Beach lies in drainage of Yingna River, the annual amount of precipitation is 855 millimeters. Numerous rivers and streams flow through the mountains, which creates seven large scaled waterfalls. In the summer season (June to August), the quantity of water increases tremendously due to heavy rainfall. This results in more water flowing in the waterfall thus making the sound of water more vibrant.

The park is 77.2 percent covered by plants and the primary forest covers an area of 91.9 hectares. The botanic diversity consists of thousands of plant species, originated from the ancient ages. The Tiannu Mulan flower (天女木兰) and the Sanya Diaozhang Tree (三亚钓樟) are nationally protected on a level one basis (the highest type of national protection of scarce plants in China). On a nationally protected level two basis, there are the Huaqu Liu Tree (花曲柳), Shuiqu Liu Tree (水曲柳), Hetao Qiu Tree (核桃秋), Huang Boluo Tree (黄菠萝), Ciqiu Tree (刺秋), Yanfu Mu Tree (盐肤木) and Dengtai Tree (灯台树). Not only are these trees protected because of their scarcity, they also have ornamental value.

In the primary forests there are plenty of Azalea flora. They take up 266 800 square metres of the total area. The altitudes where the Azaleas grow are different which causes the Azaleas to blossom in different seasons. In addition to the trees and the Azaleas, fruits and nuts are in abundance, such as grapes, kiwifruit, hawthorn, cherries, walnut, and chestnut. There is also a large number of types of mushrooms. It is possible to find Ginseng.

== Eco-tourism ==
A specific area of the park is designed for self-service fruit picking. In addition, there is another area of the park that provides adoption of fruit trees. Each visitor is allowed to adopt five trees maximum, paying an annual fee. In the harvest season, the adopter may obtain the fruits. There are also resources of protected saplings of cherry trees, pear trees, blueberry trees, apricot trees, peach trees and kiwifruit trees.

== Hot spring and spa ==
The hot spring contains metallic minerals of high temperature chloride. The water contains medicinal elements such as lithium, bromine, iron, copper, zinc, and iodine. These elements may have therapeutic effects for rheumatism and digestive diseases.

== See also ==
- List of national parks of China
