= Wafangdian =

City in Liaoning, China

Wafangdian 瓦房店市
- County-level city
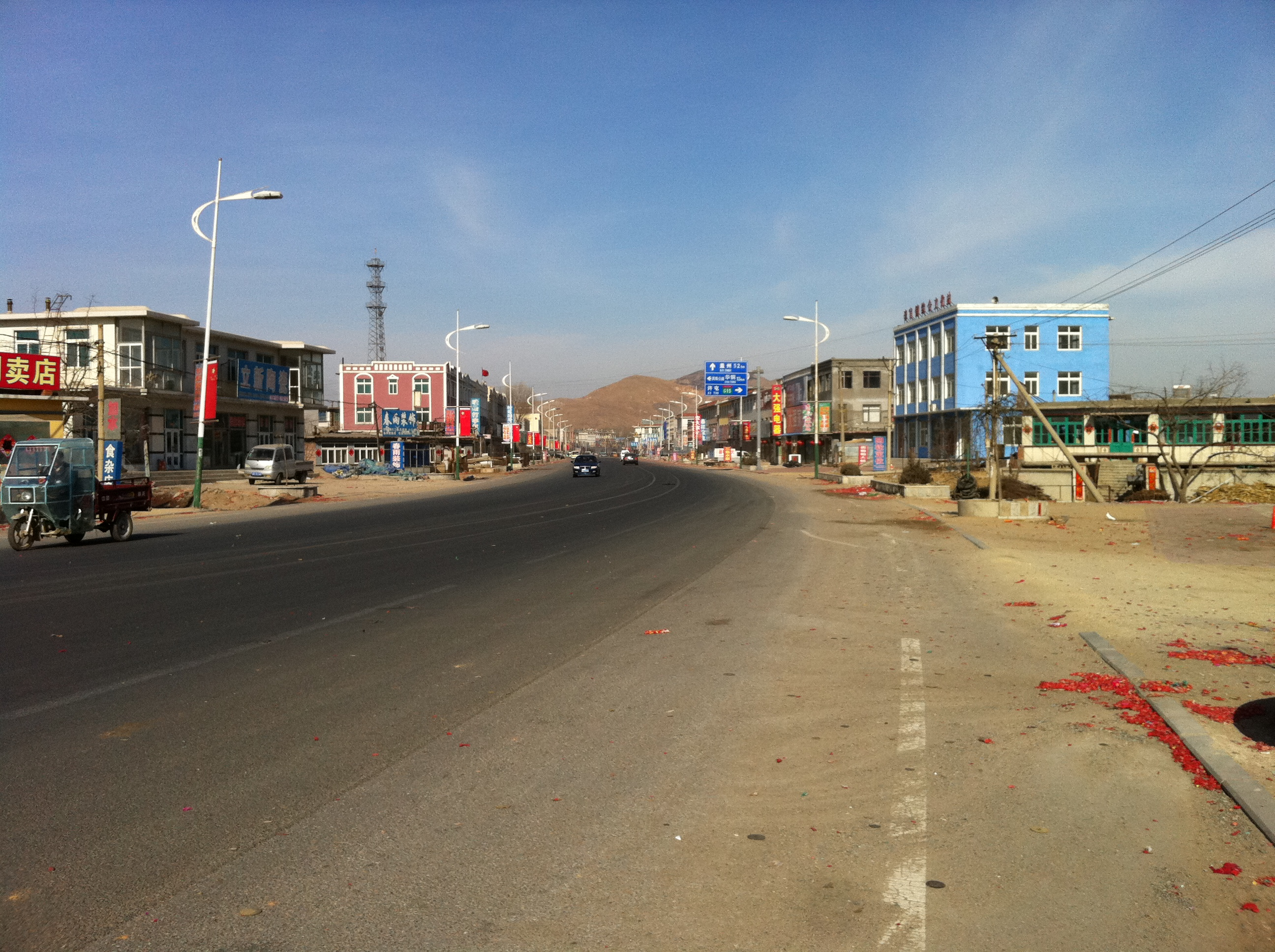

- Location in Liaoning
- Coordinates (Wafangdian government): 39°37′38″N 121°58′47″E
- Country: People's Republic of China
- Province: Liaoning
- Sub-provincial city: Dalian
- Seat: No. 1 Century Square (世纪广场1号)

Area
  - County-level city: 3,576.40 km^{2} (1,380.86 sq mi)
  - Urban: 167.50 km^{2} (64.67 sq mi)
- Elevation: 121 m (397 ft)

Population (2010)
  - County-level city: 942,197
  - Estimate (2017): 1,018,000
  - Density: 263.448/km^{2} (682.328/sq mi)
  - Urban: 330,400
- Time zone: UTC+8 (China Standard)
- Postal code: 116300
- GDP: 51.1 billion RMB (US$7.87 billion)
- GDP per capita: 48874 RMB (US$7526)
- GDP annual growth rate: 22.6%
- Division code: 210281
- Website: dlwfd.gov.cn

Wafangdian (Chinese: 瓦房店; pinyin: Wǎfángdiàn), formerly Fuhsien (Fuxian) or Fu County (simplified Chinese: 复县; traditional Chinese: 復縣; pinyin: Fù Xiàn), is one of the two "northern county-level cities", the other being Zhuanghe, under the administration of Dalian, located in the south of Liaoning province, China. The city is famous for its ball bearing industry. Wafangdian Bearing Factory is the largest bearing manufacturer in Asia and was initially built by the Japanese during World War II. Its area is 3,576.40 square kilometres (1,380.86 sq mi) and its permanent population as of 2010 is 942,197, compared to 1,024,876 registered with hukou permits. The city borders the prefecture-level city of Yingkou to the northeast.

== Overview ==
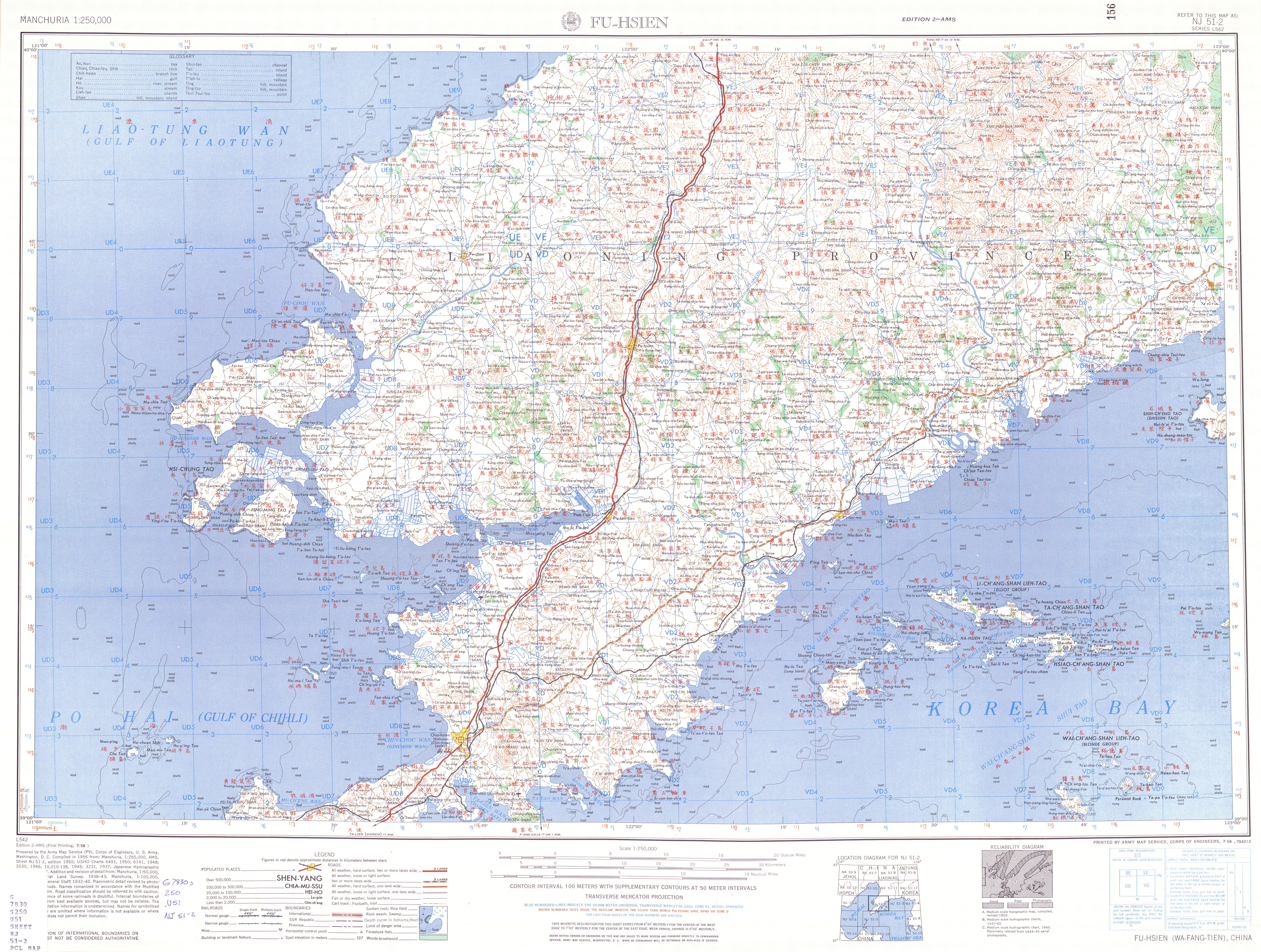
Wafangdian (labelled Fu-hsien (Wa-fang-tien) 復縣 (瓦房店)) (1956)

Wafangdian City is located in the southwest of the Liaodong Peninsula, with a total area of 3,793 square kilometres (1,464 sq mi) and a population of around 1.02 million. There are rich mines here. Wafangdian is a newly developed city of diamond in the East and its deposits of diamond account for 54% of the national proven diamond deposits. The deposits of the limestone reach over 400,000,000 cubic metres. Wafangdian is famous for bearings and apples in China. Wafangdian has solid industry base, fast-developing agriculture, convenient transportation and telecommunications.

== Climate ==
Wafangdian has a four-season, monsoon-influenced, humid continental climate (Köppen Dwa), with long, cold, windy but dry winters, and humid and very warm summers. The area experiences a seasonal delay due to the influence of the nearby ocean, which also helps temper the summers. In winter, as the Liaodong Bay is typically frozen north of the urban area of Dalian, the moderating effects of that body of water are minimised, as the Siberian high often causes winds to blow from the northwest: the monthly daily average temperature in January is −6.8 °C (19.8 °F), as compared to −3.9 °C (25.0 °F) in downtown Dalian. For Wafangdian, the same figure in August is 23.9 °C (75.0 °F). The annual mean temperature is 9.9 °C (49.8 °F). Close to half of the annual precipitation falls in July and August alone. The frost-free period is 165−185 days per annum.

Climate data for Wafangdian, elevation 119 m (390 ft), (1991–2020 normals, extremes 1971–present)
Month	Jan	Feb	Mar	Apr	May	Jun	Jul	Aug	Sep	Oct	Nov	Dec	Year
Record high °C (°F)	10.7 (51.3)	13.2 (55.8)	25.1 (77.2)	27.8 (82.0)	33.4 (92.1)	37.0 (98.6)	35.8 (96.4)	37.7 (99.9)	33.9 (93.0)	29.0 (84.2)	21.7 (71.1)	14.2 (57.6)	37.7 (99.9)
Mean daily maximum °C (°F)	−1.6 (29.1)	1.8 (35.2)	8.2 (46.8)	15.9 (60.6)	22.3 (72.1)	25.9 (78.6)	28.0 (82.4)	28.5 (83.3)	24.9 (76.8)	17.5 (63.5)	8.3 (46.9)	0.8 (33.4)	15.0 (59.1)
Daily mean °C (°F)	−6.3 (20.7)	−3.1 (26.4)	2.9 (37.2)	10.5 (50.9)	16.9 (62.4)	21.1 (70.0)	24.0 (75.2)	24.1 (75.4)	19.6 (67.3)	12.1 (53.8)	3.4 (38.1)	−3.9 (25.0)	10.1 (50.2)
Mean daily minimum °C (°F)	−10.1 (13.8)	−7.1 (19.2)	−1.3 (29.7)	5.8 (42.4)	12.1 (53.8)	17.1 (62.8)	20.9 (69.6)	20.7 (69.3)	15.2 (59.4)	7.6 (45.7)	−0.6 (30.9)	−7.6 (18.3)	6.1 (42.9)
Record low °C (°F)	−23.0 (−9.4)	−22.1 (−7.8)	−12.7 (9.1)	−3.7 (25.3)	3.5 (38.3)	9.9 (49.8)	14.3 (57.7)	10.9 (51.6)	3.1 (37.6)	−4.5 (23.9)	−13.3 (8.1)	−19.1 (−2.4)	−23.0 (−9.4)
Average precipitation mm (inches)	3.2 (0.13)	7.4 (0.29)	11.0 (0.43)	34.2 (1.35)	57.2 (2.25)	86.0 (3.39)	134.7 (5.30)	188.1 (7.41)	52.6 (2.07)	33.5 (1.32)	21.9 (0.86)	7.2 (0.28)	637 (25.08)
Average precipitation days (≥ 0.1 mm)	2.6	2.5	3.4	5.9	6.7	8.6	10.6	9.9	6.0	5.6	4.9	3.2	69.9
Average snowy days	4.4	3.3	2.6	0.6	0	0	0	0	0	0.2	2.6	4.2	17.9
Average relative humidity (%)	54	53	53	54	59	73	82	80	70	63	61	58	63
Mean monthly sunshine hours	197.2	196.0	242.4	247.2	269.2	217.3	175.8	208.6	229.6	215.4	173.4	175.8	2,547.9
Percentage possible sunshine	65	64	65	62	60	49	39	50	62	63	58	61	58
Source 1: China Meteorological Administration all-time extreme temperature
Source 2: Weather China

== Administrative divisions ==
There are 11 subdistricts, 13 towns, 6 townships, and 2 ethnic townships under the city's administration:

=== Subdistricts ===
- Xinhua Subdistrict (新华街道)
- Wenlan Subdistrict (文兰街道)
- Lingdong Subdistrict (岭东街道)
- Gongji Subdistrict (共济街道)
- Tiedong Subdistrict (铁东街道)
- Zhuhua Subdistrict (祝华街道)
- Gangdian Subdistrict (岗店街道)
- Taiyang Subdistrict (太阳街道)
- Changxingdao Subdistrict (长兴岛街道)
- Jiulong Subdistrict (九龙街道)
- Jiaoliudao Subdistrict (交流岛街道)

=== Towns ===
- Fuzhoucheng (复州城镇)
- Songshu (松树镇)
- Delisi (Telitze; Telisze) (得利寺镇)
- Wanjialing (万家岭镇)
- Xutun (许屯镇)
- Yongning (永宁镇)
- Xietun (谢屯镇)
- Laohutun (老虎屯镇)
- Hongyanhe (红沿河镇)
- Liguan (李官镇)
- Xianyuwan (仙浴湾镇)
- Yuantai (元台镇)
- Wawo (瓦窝镇)

=== Townships ===
- Zhaotun Township (赵屯乡)
- Tucheng Township (土城乡)
- Yandian Township (阎店乡)
- Xiyang Township (西杨乡)
- Tuoshan Township (驼山乡)
- Paoai Township (泡崖乡)

=== Ethnic Townships ===
- Santai Manchu Ethnic Township (三台满族乡)
- Yangjia Manchu Ethnic Township (杨家满族乡)

== Economy ==
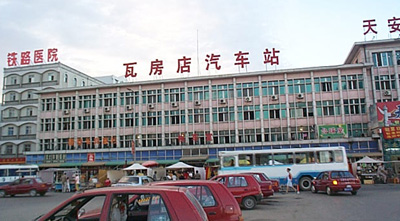
Main Bus Station, Wafangdian City, Dalian, Liaoning (2002)

Wafangdian's basic industry is industry, agriculture, fishing, and mining. Bearing industry is the main income for the citizen. Nearly 50% population engage in the bearing business. It is called the "bearing capital" of China, more than 400 bearing factories in this city, including the Chinese No. 1 brand "ZWZ". Wafangdian also produces apples and other fruits. Its fishing industry prospers in the Bohai Sea. It is also noted for producing diamonds.

Wafangdian is also quickly industrialized. China's largest bearing company (ZWZ), established in 1938, is also located here. Wafangdian is also noted for the Changxing Island Seaport Industrial Area and Hongyanhe Nuclear Power Station.

For its sightseeing locations, there is Laomao Mountain, located in the eastern part, on the border with Pulandian City.

=== Coastal Area ===
Wafangdian has 461 kilometres of coastline and the annual aquatic output is over 250,000 tons including sea cucumber, prawn, clam, crab, mullet, Spanish mackerel, jellyfish, scallop, abalone and mantis-shrimp etc. The following thirteen towns and communes belong to this area: Changxingdao, Jiaoliudao, Donggang, Fuzhouwan, Paotai, Xianyuwan, Yongning, Xiyang, Tuoshan and Santai, etc.

=== Investment Area for the Agriculture and Native Products Process ===
Wafangdian has rich agriculture and native products. The total export value exceeds RMB 1 billion yuan in 1999. The main products include meat-chick, bee-honey, peanut, dried-gourd, burdock, horseradish, red-bean and other products. The products are mainly produced and processed in the following 14 towns: Fuzhoucheng Town, Laohutun Town, Paotai Town, Yong-ning Town, etc..

=== Subarea for Industry Production ===
Wafangdian has a solid industry base with complete product kinds. There are many industries such as bearings, parts for auto and the agriculture machinery, castings, machinery process, foodstuff, textile, and garment, etc.. The following towns and communes include this subarea: Yongning, Laohutun, Yandian, and the Subdistricts of Zhuhua, etc..

=== Investment Area for Fruit Process ===
Wafangdian has rich resources in fruit. The total output reached over 300,000 tons in 1999, The main fruits are as following: apple, pear, plum, peach, strawchew, apricot, and grape, etc.. Thirteen towns and communes belong to this subarea: Wanjialing, Songshu Tucheng, and Gangdian Subdistrict, etc..

=== Investment Subarea for Tourism and Service in Wafangdian ===
Wafangdian has a beach, sand, scenic spots, and a natural warm spring. All this provides good conditions for tours here. The following places are satisfied for tourism service, they are Changxingdiao Town, Liguan Town, Xutun Town, Xianyuwan Town, and Tuoshan Commune, etc.

=== Economic Development Zone ===
Wafangdian Economic Development Subarea is located in the south-west of Wafangdian. It is two kilometres from the centre of the city. The planned area of the Economic Development Zone is 2.9 km^{2} (1.1 sq mi) including the Hi-tech Garden, Industry Process Area, Storage and Transportation Area, Living Area and the Service Area and also there is the green area. The roads have been built now and the "five-through and one flat" engineering will be finished soon.

== See also ==
- Changxing Island
