= Pulandian, Dalian =

Pulandian 普兰店区 Port Adams
- District
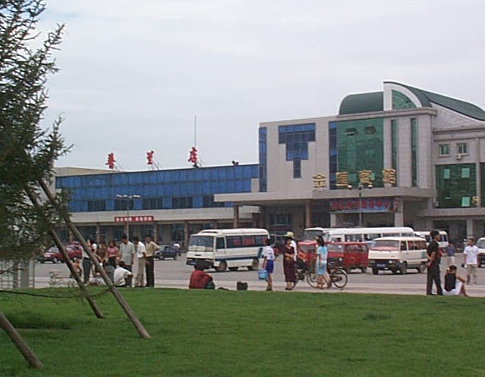
- Pulandian Railway Station (2002)

- Location in Liaoning
- Coordinates: 39°24′32″N 121°58′01″E
- Country: People's Republic of China
- Province: Liaoning
- Sub-provincial city: Dalian
- Seat: No. 12 Fuqian Road (府前路12号)

Area
  - Total: 2,769.90 km^{2} (1,069.46 sq mi)

Population (2010)
  - Total: 741,230
  - Density: 267.60/km^{2} (693.09/sq mi)
- Time zone: UTC+8 (China Standard)
- Postal code: 116200
- Division code: 210214
- Website: www.dlpld.gov.cn

Pulandian District (simplified Chinese: 普兰店区; traditional Chinese: 普蘭店區; pinyin: Pǔlándiàn Qū) is one of the seven districts under the administration of Dalian, located in the south of Liaoning province, People's Republic of China. Its area is 2,769.90 square kilometres (1,069.46 sq mi) and its permanent population as of 2010 is 741,230. The district borders the prefecture-level city of Yingkou to the north.

== Geography ==
Pulandian District is located in the northern part of Dalian on the Liaodong Peninsula. It covers an area of 6968 square kilometers. It borders Zhuanghe to the east, Wafangdian to the west, Jinzhou District to the south and Greater Yingkou to the north. Its area is 2923 square kilometres.

Pulandian has a long coast line on the Yellow Sea in its southeastern part and a short coastline on the Bohai Sea in its southwestern part.

=== Administrative divisions ===
There are 18 subdistricts under the district's administration.

Subdistricts:

- Fengrong Subdistrict (丰荣街道)
- Tiexi Subdistrict (铁西街道)
- Taiping Subdistrict (太平街道)
- Pikou Subdistrict (皮口街道)
- Chengzitan Subdistrict (城子坦街道)
- Daliujia Subdistrict (大刘家街道)
- Yangshufang Subdistrict (杨树房街道)
- Datan Subdistrict (大谭街道)
- Tangjiafang Subdistrict (唐家房街道)
- Lianshan Subdistrict (莲山街道)
- Anbo Subdistrict (安波街道)
- Shabao Subdistrict (沙包街道)
- Xingtai Subdistrict (星台街道)
- Mopan Subdistrict (墨盘街道)
- Tongyi Subdistrict (同益街道)
- Lejia Subdistrict (乐甲街道)
- Shuangta Subdistrict (双塔街道)
- Siping Subdistrict (四平街道)

== Climate ==
Climate data for Pulandian, elevation 12 m (39 ft), (1991–2020 normals, extremes 1981–present)
| Month | Jan | Feb | Mar | Apr | May | Jun | Jul | Aug | Sep | Oct | Nov | Dec | Year |
|---|---|---|---|---|---|---|---|---|---|---|---|---|---|
| Record high °C (°F) | 13.0 (55.4) | 13.5 (56.3) | 20.2 (68.4) | 28.0 (82.4) | 35.1 (95.2) | 36.0 (96.8) | 38.5 (101.3) | 39.0 (102.2) | 32.7 (90.9) | 28.9 (84.0) | 22.1 (71.8) | 16.0 (60.8) | 39.0 (102.2) |
| Mean daily maximum °C (°F) | −0.6 (30.9) | 2.6 (36.7) | 8.7 (47.7) | 16.2 (61.2) | 22.5 (72.5) | 26.2 (79.2) | 28.6 (83.5) | 29.1 (84.4) | 25.6 (78.1) | 18.4 (65.1) | 9.3 (48.7) | 1.7 (35.1) | 15.7 (60.3) |
| Daily mean °C (°F) | −6.4 (20.5) | −3.1 (26.4) | 3.1 (37.6) | 10.5 (50.9) | 16.8 (62.2) | 21.2 (70.2) | 24.3 (75.7) | 24.5 (76.1) | 19.7 (67.5) | 12.1 (53.8) | 3.6 (38.5) | −3.8 (25.2) | 10.2 (50.4) |
| Mean daily minimum °C (°F) | −11.0 (12.2) | −7.8 (18.0) | −1.8 (28.8) | 5.5 (41.9) | 11.8 (53.2) | 16.9 (62.4) | 21.0 (69.8) | 20.7 (69.3) | 14.6 (58.3) | 6.7 (44.1) | −1.2 (29.8) | −8.1 (17.4) | 5.6 (42.1) |
| Record low °C (°F) | −24.8 (−12.6) | −21.3 (−6.3) | −12.1 (10.2) | −4.4 (24.1) | 3.2 (37.8) | 9.6 (49.3) | 12.8 (55.0) | 10.1 (50.2) | 1.4 (34.5) | −7.0 (19.4) | −14.3 (6.3) | −21.1 (−6.0) | −24.8 (−12.6) |
| Average precipitation mm (inches) | 3.7 (0.15) | 7.9 (0.31) | 11.4 (0.45) | 34.4 (1.35) | 60.1 (2.37) | 77.7 (3.06) | 134.8 (5.31) | 175.8 (6.92) | 57.7 (2.27) | 32.7 (1.29) | 21.6 (0.85) | 7.1 (0.28) | 624.9 (24.61) |
| Average precipitation days (≥ 0.1 mm) | 2.5 | 2.7 | 3.0 | 5.9 | 7.1 | 9.0 | 10.2 | 9.8 | 6.1 | 5.7 | 4.8 | 3.2 | 70 |
| Average snowy days | 3.9 | 2.8 | 2.0 | 0.4 | 0 | 0 | 0 | 0 | 0 | 0.2 | 2.2 | 4.1 | 15.6 |
| Average relative humidity (%) | 61 | 61 | 59 | 59 | 64 | 75 | 83 | 83 | 75 | 69 | 66 | 64 | 68 |
| Mean monthly sunshine hours | 198.7 | 191.7 | 235.5 | 240.3 | 259.8 | 214.5 | 179.0 | 203.3 | 222.2 | 211.6 | 174.4 | 179.4 | 2,510.4 |
| Percentage possible sunshine | 66 | 63 | 63 | 60 | 58 | 48 | 40 | 48 | 60 | 62 | 59 | 62 | 57 |
Source: China Meteorological Administrationall-time July and August (and all-time extreme) temperature

Climate data for Pikou Town, Pulandian, elevation 43 m (141 ft), (1991–2020 normals, extremes 1972–present)
| Month | Jan | Feb | Mar | Apr | May | Jun | Jul | Aug | Sep | Oct | Nov | Dec | Year |
|---|---|---|---|---|---|---|---|---|---|---|---|---|---|
| Record high °C (°F) | 8.5 (47.3) | 13.6 (56.5) | 18.2 (64.8) | 27.2 (81.0) | 30.6 (87.1) | 37.8 (100.0) | 34.8 (94.6) | 37.9 (100.2) | 31.6 (88.9) | 27.7 (81.9) | 19.4 (66.9) | 12.1 (53.8) | 37.9 (100.2) |
| Mean daily maximum °C (°F) | −0.8 (30.6) | 1.7 (35.1) | 7.0 (44.6) | 14.0 (57.2) | 20.0 (68.0) | 23.0 (73.4) | 26.2 (79.2) | 27.6 (81.7) | 24.3 (75.7) | 17.7 (63.9) | 9.0 (48.2) | 1.0 (33.8) | 14.2 (57.6) |
| Daily mean °C (°F) | −6.0 (21.2) | −3.2 (26.2) | 2.7 (36.9) | 9.6 (49.3) | 15.7 (60.3) | 19.8 (67.6) | 23.4 (74.1) | 24.3 (75.7) | 19.8 (67.6) | 12.6 (54.7) | 4.2 (39.6) | −3.7 (25.3) | 9.9 (49.9) |
| Mean daily minimum °C (°F) | −10.0 (14.0) | −7.1 (19.2) | −1.2 (29.8) | 5.7 (42.3) | 12.0 (53.6) | 17.1 (62.8) | 21.1 (70.0) | 21.2 (70.2) | 15.4 (59.7) | 7.9 (46.2) | −0.1 (31.8) | −7.5 (18.5) | 6.2 (43.2) |
| Record low °C (°F) | −21.5 (−6.7) | −19.9 (−3.8) | −11.2 (11.8) | −2.9 (26.8) | 3.0 (37.4) | 9.6 (49.3) | 15.7 (60.3) | 11.6 (52.9) | 2.5 (36.5) | −5.0 (23.0) | −13.3 (8.1) | −18.7 (−1.7) | −21.5 (−6.7) |
| Average precipitation mm (inches) | 3.3 (0.13) | 11.7 (0.46) | 15.0 (0.59) | 39.3 (1.55) | 67.6 (2.66) | 74.2 (2.92) | 125.5 (4.94) | 180.5 (7.11) | 53.6 (2.11) | 30.6 (1.20) | 29.0 (1.14) | 8.6 (0.34) | 638.9 (25.15) |
| Average precipitation days (≥ 0.1 mm) | 2.6 | 2.7 | 3.4 | 5.9 | 7.5 | 8.8 | 10.8 | 10.0 | 6.8 | 5.3 | 5.4 | 3.3 | 72.5 |
| Average snowy days | 3.3 | 2.5 | 2.0 | 0.5 | 0 | 0 | 0 | 0 | 0 | 0.1 | 1.4 | 3.4 | 13.2 |
| Average relative humidity (%) | 56 | 58 | 60 | 63 | 68 | 82 | 86 | 84 | 74 | 66 | 63 | 60 | 68 |
| Mean monthly sunshine hours | 196.8 | 189.4 | 228.9 | 235.1 | 248.6 | 200.4 | 171.1 | 205.4 | 224.1 | 213.9 | 168.6 | 172.1 | 2,454.4 |
| Percentage possible sunshine | 65 | 62 | 62 | 59 | 56 | 45 | 38 | 49 | 61 | 63 | 57 | 59 | 56 |
Source: China Meteorological Administrationall-time June and Extreme (August) temperature

== Demography ==
Pulandian has a population of 915,595. (est. 2015)

== Economy ==
Pulandian's industries are agriculture, fishing and the three main manufacturing industries: fabrics, electric machinery and food.

== Transportation ==
- Harbin-Shenyang-Dalian Railway
- Harbin-Shenyang-Dalian High Speed Railway (to be completed in 2013)
- Shenyang-Dalian Expressway
