= Changxing Island, Dalian =

Island in Dalian of Liaoning Province, China

Changxing Island
Native name: 长兴岛
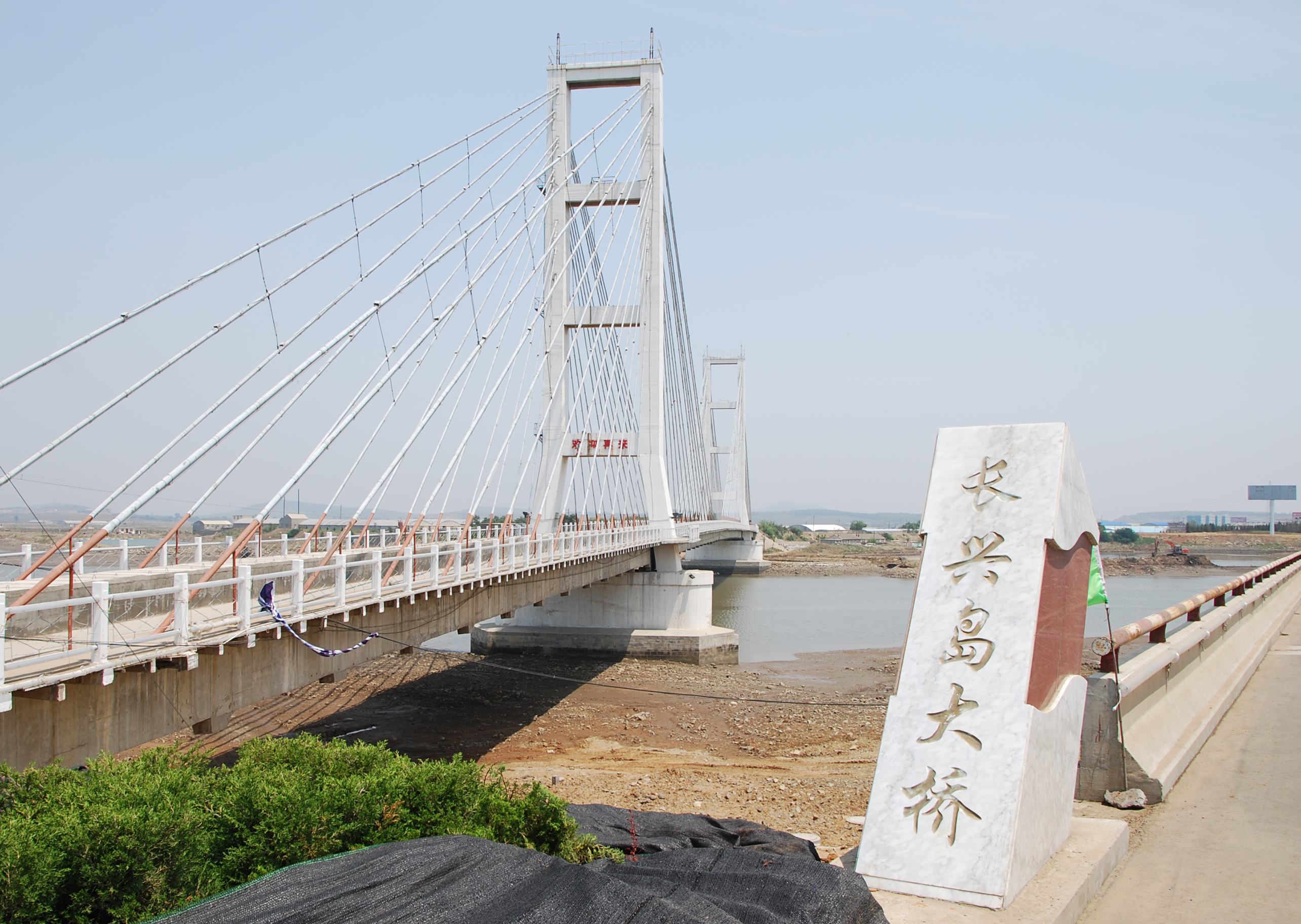
- The island is accessed by crossing Changxing Island Bridge, beside which can be seen a suspension bridge for pedestrians

- Location within Liaoning

Geography
- Location: Bohai Sea
- Coordinates: 39°34′51″N 121°23′15″E
- Area: 252.5 km^{2} (97.5 sq mi)
- Area rank: 7 (Mainland China)

Administration
- People's Republic of China
- Province: Liaoning
- Division: Dalian
- City: Wafangdian

Demographics
- Population: 60,000

Changxing Island (simplified Chinese: 长兴岛; traditional Chinese: 長興島; pinyin: Chángxīng Dǎo) (Changsing) is a major island located in the eastern part of Bohai Sea, off the coast of Wafangdian, Dalian, Liaoning, China. It has a population of around 60,000.

== General ==
Changxing Island is located in the eastern part of Bohai Sea, off the coast of Wafangdian, Dalian, Liaoning. It is the sixth largest island in Greater China and the largest island north of the Chongming Island on the Yangtze River. Its area is 252.5 square kilometers (97.5 sq mi), running about 30 kilometers (19 mi) east to west and 11 kilometers (6.8 mi) north to south.

Traditionally based on fishing and agriculture, its economy changed to distribution, industrial and resort development. It is an epicenter for the modernization of the People's Liberation Army Navy.

== Dalian Changxing Island Seaport Industrial Area ==
This industrial area consists of Changxing, Jiaoliu and three other islands, a total area of 350 square kilometers. It was made a Provincial Economic Development Zone by the Liaoning provincial government in January 2002, and later in 2006, was made part of the "Five Points, One Line" industrial zone development plan. Its management committee was established by the Dalian municipal government in May 2005.

There are already the following projects:

- Connection by a bridge to the mainland
- International golf course (Dalian Changxing Island Golf Resort, Japan)
- Limestone mining (Nittetsu Mining, Japan)
- Large seaport
- Large shipbuilding (STX Corporation, Korea)
- Oxygen plant (Taiyo Nippon Sanso Corporation, Japan)
- Petrochemical complex
- Wind power station

== See also ==
- China National and Provincial Economic and Technological Development Zones
