= List of administrative divisions of Heilongjiang =

Heilongjiang Province
- Province
- Capital: Harbin

Prefecture-level divisions
- Sub-provincial cities: 1
- Prefectural cities: 11
- Prefectures: 1

County level divisions
- County cities: 21
- Counties: 45
- Autonomous counties: 1
- Districts / ethnic districts: 54

Township level divisions
- Towns: 443
- Townships: 477
- Ethnic townships / towns^{*}: 56
- Subdistricts: 393

Villages level divisions
- Communities: 3,755
- Administrative villages: 9,050
- Daxing'anling Prefecture districts are not counted into the figures above.

Heilongjiang, a province of the People's Republic of China, is made up of the following administrative divisions.

== Administrative divisions ==
These administrative divisions are explained in greater detail at Administrative divisions of the People's Republic of China. The following table lists only the prefecture-level and county-level divisions of Heilongjiang.

Prefecture level (Division code)	County Level				
Prefecture level (Division code)	Name	Chinese	Hanyu Pinyin	Division code	
Harbin city 哈尔滨市; Hā'ěrbīn Shì (Capital – Sub-provincial) (2301 / HRB)	Daoli District	道里区	Dàolǐ Qū	230102	DLH
Harbin city 哈尔滨市; Hā'ěrbīn Shì (Capital – Sub-provincial) (2301 / HRB)	Nangang District	南岗区	Nángǎng Qū	230103	NGQ
Harbin city 哈尔滨市; Hā'ěrbīn Shì (Capital – Sub-provincial) (2301 / HRB)	Daowai District	道外区	Dàowài Qū	230104	DWQ
Harbin city 哈尔滨市; Hā'ěrbīn Shì (Capital – Sub-provincial) (2301 / HRB)	Pingfang District	平房区	Píngfáng Qū	230108	PFQ
Harbin city 哈尔滨市; Hā'ěrbīn Shì (Capital – Sub-provincial) (2301 / HRB)	Songbei District	松北区	Sōngběi Qū	230109	SBU
Harbin city 哈尔滨市; Hā'ěrbīn Shì (Capital – Sub-provincial) (2301 / HRB)	Xiangfang District	香坊区	Xiāngfáng Qū	230110	XFQ
Harbin city 哈尔滨市; Hā'ěrbīn Shì (Capital – Sub-provincial) (2301 / HRB)	Hulan District	呼兰区	Hūlán Qū	230111	HLH
Harbin city 哈尔滨市; Hā'ěrbīn Shì (Capital – Sub-provincial) (2301 / HRB)	Acheng District	阿城区	Àchéng Qū	230112	ACQ
Harbin city 哈尔滨市; Hā'ěrbīn Shì (Capital – Sub-provincial) (2301 / HRB)	Shuangcheng District	双城区	Shuāngchéng Qū	230113	SCA
Harbin city 哈尔滨市; Hā'ěrbīn Shì (Capital – Sub-provincial) (2301 / HRB)	Yilan County	依兰县	Yīlán Xiàn	230123	YLH
Harbin city 哈尔滨市; Hā'ěrbīn Shì (Capital – Sub-provincial) (2301 / HRB)	Fangzheng County	方正县	Fāngzhèng Xiàn	230124	FZH
Harbin city 哈尔滨市; Hā'ěrbīn Shì (Capital – Sub-provincial) (2301 / HRB)	Binxian County (Note: Official name registered by the Ministry of Civil Affairs.)	宾县	Bīnxiàn	230125	BNX
Harbin city 哈尔滨市; Hā'ěrbīn Shì (Capital – Sub-provincial) (2301 / HRB)	Bayan County	巴彦县	Bāyàn Xiàn	230126	BYH
Harbin city 哈尔滨市; Hā'ěrbīn Shì (Capital – Sub-provincial) (2301 / HRB)	Mulan County	木兰县	Mùlán Xiàn	230127	MUL
Harbin city 哈尔滨市; Hā'ěrbīn Shì (Capital – Sub-provincial) (2301 / HRB)	Tonghe County	通河县	Tōnghé Xiàn	230128	TOH
Harbin city 哈尔滨市; Hā'ěrbīn Shì (Capital – Sub-provincial) (2301 / HRB)	Yanshou County	延寿县	Yánshòu Xiàn	230129	YSU
Harbin city 哈尔滨市; Hā'ěrbīn Shì (Capital – Sub-provincial) (2301 / HRB)	Shangzhi city	尚志市	Shàngzhì Shì	230183	SZI
Harbin city 哈尔滨市; Hā'ěrbīn Shì (Capital – Sub-provincial) (2301 / HRB)	Wuchang city	五常市	Wǔcháng Shì	230184	WCA
Qiqihar city 齐齐哈尔市; Qíqíhā'ěr Shì (2302 / NDG)	Longsha District	龙沙区	Lóngshā Qū	230202	LQQ
Qiqihar city 齐齐哈尔市; Qíqíhā'ěr Shì (2302 / NDG)	Jianhua District	建华区	Jiànhuá Qū	230203	JHQ
Qiqihar city 齐齐哈尔市; Qíqíhā'ěr Shì (2302 / NDG)	Tiefeng District	铁峰区	Tiěfēng Qū	230204	TFQ
Qiqihar city 齐齐哈尔市; Qíqíhā'ěr Shì (2302 / NDG)	Ang'angxi District	昂昂溪区	Áng'ángxī Qū	230205	AAX
Qiqihar city 齐齐哈尔市; Qíqíhā'ěr Shì (2302 / NDG)	Fularji District	富拉尔基区	Fùlā'ěrjī Qū	230206	HUE
Qiqihar city 齐齐哈尔市; Qíqíhā'ěr Shì (2302 / NDG)	Nianzishan District	碾子山区	Niǎnzishān Qū	230207	NZS
Qiqihar city 齐齐哈尔市; Qíqíhā'ěr Shì (2302 / NDG)	Meilisi Daur District	梅里斯达斡尔族区	Méilǐsī Dáwò'ěrzú Qū	230208	MLS
Qiqihar city 齐齐哈尔市; Qíqíhā'ěr Shì (2302 / NDG)	Longjiang County	龙江县	Lóngjiāng Xiàn	230221	LGJ
Qiqihar city 齐齐哈尔市; Qíqíhā'ěr Shì (2302 / NDG)	Yi'an County	依安县	Yī'ān Xiàn	230223	YAN
Qiqihar city 齐齐哈尔市; Qíqíhā'ěr Shì (2302 / NDG)	Tailai County	泰来县	Tàilái Xiàn	230224	TLA
Qiqihar city 齐齐哈尔市; Qíqíhā'ěr Shì (2302 / NDG)	Gannan County	甘南县	Gānnán Xiàn	230225	GNX
Qiqihar city 齐齐哈尔市; Qíqíhā'ěr Shì (2302 / NDG)	Fuyu County	富裕县	Fùyù Xiàn	230227	FYX
Qiqihar city 齐齐哈尔市; Qíqíhā'ěr Shì (2302 / NDG)	Keshan County	克山县	Kèshān Xiàn	230229	KSN
Qiqihar city 齐齐哈尔市; Qíqíhā'ěr Shì (2302 / NDG)	Kedong County	克东县	Kèdōng Xiàn	230230	KDO
Qiqihar city 齐齐哈尔市; Qíqíhā'ěr Shì (2302 / NDG)	Baiquan County	拜泉县	Bàiquán Xiàn	230231	BQN
Qiqihar city 齐齐哈尔市; Qíqíhā'ěr Shì (2302 / NDG)	Nehe city	讷河市	Nēhé Shì	230281	NEH
Jixi city 鸡西市; Jīxī Shì (2303 / JXI)	Jiguan District	鸡冠区	Jīguān Qū	230302	JGU
Jixi city 鸡西市; Jīxī Shì (2303 / JXI)	Hengshan District	恒山区	Héngshān Qū	230303	HSD
Jixi city 鸡西市; Jīxī Shì (2303 / JXI)	Didao District	滴道区	Dīdào Qū	230304	DDO
Jixi city 鸡西市; Jīxī Shì (2303 / JXI)	Lishu District	梨树区	Líshù Qū	230305	LJX
Jixi city 鸡西市; Jīxī Shì (2303 / JXI)	Chengzihe District	城子河区	Chéngzǐhé Qū	230306	CZH
Jixi city 鸡西市; Jīxī Shì (2303 / JXI)	Mashan District	麻山区	Máshān Qū	230307	MSN
Jixi city 鸡西市; Jīxī Shì (2303 / JXI)	Jidong County	鸡东县	Jīdōng Xiàn	230321	JID
Jixi city 鸡西市; Jīxī Shì (2303 / JXI)	Hulin city	虎林市	Hǔlín Shì	230381	HUL
Jixi city 鸡西市; Jīxī Shì (2303 / JXI)	Mishan city	密山市	Mìshān Shì	230382	MIS
Hegang city 鹤岗市; Hègǎng Shì (2304 / HEG)	Xiangyang District	向阳区	Xiàngyáng Qū	230402	XYZ
Hegang city 鹤岗市; Hègǎng Shì (2304 / HEG)	Gongnong District	工农区	Gōngnóng Qū	230403	GNH
Hegang city 鹤岗市; Hègǎng Shì (2304 / HEG)	Nanshan District	南山区	Nánshān Qū	230404	NSQ
Hegang city 鹤岗市; Hègǎng Shì (2304 / HEG)	Xing'an District	兴安区	Xīng'ān Qū	230405	XAH
Hegang city 鹤岗市; Hègǎng Shì (2304 / HEG)	Dongshan District	东山区	Dōngshān Qū	230406	DSA
Hegang city 鹤岗市; Hègǎng Shì (2304 / HEG)	Xingshan District	兴山区	Xìngshān Qū	230407	XSQ
Hegang city 鹤岗市; Hègǎng Shì (2304 / HEG)	Luobei County	萝北县	Luóběi Xiàn	230421	LUB
Hegang city 鹤岗市; Hègǎng Shì (2304 / HEG)	Suibin County	绥滨县	Suíbīn Xiàn	230422	SBN
Shuangyashan city 双鸭山市; Shuāngyāshān Shì (2305 / SYS)	Jianshan District	尖山区	Jiānshān Qū	230502	JSQ
Shuangyashan city 双鸭山市; Shuāngyāshān Shì (2305 / SYS)	Lingdong District	岭东区	Lǐngdōng Qū	230503	LDQ
Shuangyashan city 双鸭山市; Shuāngyāshān Shì (2305 / SYS)	Sifangtai District	四方台区	Sìfāngtái Qū	230505	SFT
Shuangyashan city 双鸭山市; Shuāngyāshān Shì (2305 / SYS)	Baoshan District	宝山区	Bǎoshān Qū	230506	BSQ
Shuangyashan city 双鸭山市; Shuāngyāshān Shì (2305 / SYS)	Jixian County	集贤县	Jíxián Xiàn	230521	JXH
Shuangyashan city 双鸭山市; Shuāngyāshān Shì (2305 / SYS)	Youyi County	友谊县	Yǒuyì Xiàn	230522	YYI
Shuangyashan city 双鸭山市; Shuāngyāshān Shì (2305 / SYS)	Baoqing County	宝清县	Bǎoqīng Xiàn	230523	BQG
Shuangyashan city 双鸭山市; Shuāngyāshān Shì (2305 / SYS)	Raohe County	饶河县	Ráohé Xiàn	230524	ROH
Daqing city 大庆市; Dàqìng Shì (2306 / DQG)	Sartu District	萨尔图区	Sà'ěrtú Qū	230602	SAI
Daqing city 大庆市; Dàqìng Shì (2306 / DQG)	Longfeng District	龙凤区	Lóngfèng Qū	230603	LFQ
Daqing city 大庆市; Dàqìng Shì (2306 / DQG)	Ranghulu District	让胡路区	Rànghúlù Qū	230604	RHL
Daqing city 大庆市; Dàqìng Shì (2306 / DQG)	Honggang District	红岗区	Hónggǎng Qū	230605	HGD
Daqing city 大庆市; Dàqìng Shì (2306 / DQG)	Datong District	大同区	Dàtóng Qū	230606	DTD
Daqing city 大庆市; Dàqìng Shì (2306 / DQG)	Zhaozhou County	肇州县	Zhàozhōu Xiàn	230621	ZAZ
Daqing city 大庆市; Dàqìng Shì (2306 / DQG)	Zhaoyuan County	肇源县	Zhàoyuán Xiàn	230622	ZYH
Daqing city 大庆市; Dàqìng Shì (2306 / DQG)	Lindian County	林甸县	Líndiàn Xiàn	230623	LDN
Daqing city 大庆市; Dàqìng Shì (2306 / DQG)	Durbote County (Note: Conventional name: Dorbod Mongol Autonomous County; Chinese: 杜尔伯特蒙古族自治县; pinyin: Dù'ěrbótè Měnggǔzú Zìzhìxiàn)	杜尔伯特县	Dù'ěrbótè Xiàn	230624	DOM
Yichun city 伊春市; Yīchūn Shì (2307 / YCH)	Youhao District	友好区	Yǒuhǎo Qū	230704	YOH
Yichun city 伊春市; Yīchūn Shì (2307 / YCH)	Yimei District	伊美区	Yīměi Qū	230717	
Yichun city 伊春市; Yīchūn Shì (2307 / YCH)	Wucui District	乌翠区	Wūcuì Qū	230718	
Yichun city 伊春市; Yīchūn Shì (2307 / YCH)	Jinlin District	金林区	Jīnlín Qū	230719	
Yichun city 伊春市; Yīchūn Shì (2307 / YCH)	Jiayin County	嘉荫县	Jiāyīn Xiàn	230722	JAY
Yichun city 伊春市; Yīchūn Shì (2307 / YCH)	Tangwang County	汤旺县	Tāngwàng Xiàn	230723	
Yichun city 伊春市; Yīchūn Shì (2307 / YCH)	Fenglin County	丰林县	Fēnglín Xiàn	230724	
Yichun city 伊春市; Yīchūn Shì (2307 / YCH)	Nancha County	南岔县	Nánchà Xiàn	230725	
Yichun city 伊春市; Yīchūn Shì (2307 / YCH)	Dajingshan County	大箐山县	Dàqìngshān Xiàn	230726	
Yichun city 伊春市; Yīchūn Shì (2307 / YCH)	Tieli city	铁力市	Tiělì Shì	230781	TEL
Jiamusi city 佳木斯市; Jiāmùsī Shì (2308 / JMU)	Xiangyang District	向阳区	Xiàngyáng Qū	230803	XYQ
Jiamusi city 佳木斯市; Jiāmùsī Shì (2308 / JMU)	Qianjin District	前进区	Qiánjìn Qū	230804	QJQ
Jiamusi city 佳木斯市; Jiāmùsī Shì (2308 / JMU)	Dongfeng District	东风区	Dōngfēng Qū	230805	DFQ
Jiamusi city 佳木斯市; Jiāmùsī Shì (2308 / JMU)	Jiaoqu District	郊区	Jiāoqū	230811	JQJ
Jiamusi city 佳木斯市; Jiāmùsī Shì (2308 / JMU)	Huanan County	桦南县	Huànán Xiàn	230822	HNH
Jiamusi city 佳木斯市; Jiāmùsī Shì (2308 / JMU)	Huachuan County	桦川县	Huàchuān Xiàn	230826	HCN
Jiamusi city 佳木斯市; Jiāmùsī Shì (2308 / JMU)	Tangyuan County	汤原县	Tāngyuán Xiàn	230828	TYX
Jiamusi city 佳木斯市; Jiāmùsī Shì (2308 / JMU)	Tongjiang city	同江市	Tóngjiāng Shì	230881	TOJ
Jiamusi city 佳木斯市; Jiāmùsī Shì (2308 / JMU)	Fujin city	富锦市	Fùjǐn Shì	230882	FUJ
Jiamusi city 佳木斯市; Jiāmùsī Shì (2308 / JMU)	Fuyuan city	抚远市	Fǔyuǎn Shì	230883	FYF
Qitaihe city 七台河市; Qītáihé Shì (2309 / QTH)	Xinxing District	新兴区	Xīnxīng Qū	230902	XXQ
Qitaihe city 七台河市; Qītáihé Shì (2309 / QTH)	Taoshan District	桃山区	Táoshān Qū	230903	TSC
Qitaihe city 七台河市; Qītáihé Shì (2309 / QTH)	Qiezihe District	茄子河区	Qiézihé Qū	230904	QZI
Qitaihe city 七台河市; Qītáihé Shì (2309 / QTH)	Boli County	勃利县	Bólì Xiàn	230921	BLI
Mudanjiang city 牡丹江市; Mǔdānjiāng Shì (2310 / MDG)	Dong'an District	东安区	Dōng'ān Qū	231002	DGA
Mudanjiang city 牡丹江市; Mǔdānjiāng Shì (2310 / MDG)	Yangming District	阳明区	Yángmíng Qū	231003	YMQ
Mudanjiang city 牡丹江市; Mǔdānjiāng Shì (2310 / MDG)	Aimin District	爱民区	Àimín Qū	231004	AMQ
Mudanjiang city 牡丹江市; Mǔdānjiāng Shì (2310 / MDG)	Xi'an District	西安区	Xī'ān Qū	231005	XAQ
Mudanjiang city 牡丹江市; Mǔdānjiāng Shì (2310 / MDG)	Linkou County	林口县	Línkǒu Xiàn	231025	LKO
Mudanjiang city 牡丹江市; Mǔdānjiāng Shì (2310 / MDG)	Suifenhe city	绥芬河市	Suífēnhé Shì	231081	SFE
Mudanjiang city 牡丹江市; Mǔdānjiāng Shì (2310 / MDG)	Hailin city	海林市	Hǎilín Shì	231083	HLS
Mudanjiang city 牡丹江市; Mǔdānjiāng Shì (2310 / MDG)	Ning'an city	宁安市	Níng'ān Shì	231084	NAI
Mudanjiang city 牡丹江市; Mǔdānjiāng Shì (2310 / MDG)	Muling city	穆棱市	Mùlíng Shì (Note: not Mùléng)	231085	MLG
Mudanjiang city 牡丹江市; Mǔdānjiāng Shì (2310 / MDG)	Dongning city	东宁市	Dōngníng Shì	231086	DNA
Heihe city 黑河市; Hēihé Shì (2311 / HEK)	Aihui District	瑷珲区	Àihún Qū	231102	AHQ
Heihe city 黑河市; Hēihé Shì (2311 / HEK)	Xunke County	逊克县	Xùnkè Xiàn	231123	NJH
Heihe city 黑河市; Hēihé Shì (2311 / HEK)	Sunwu County	孙吴县	Sūnwú Xiàn	231124	XUK
Heihe city 黑河市; Hēihé Shì (2311 / HEK)	Bei'an city	北安市	Běi'ān Shì	231181	SUW
Heihe city 黑河市; Hēihé Shì (2311 / HEK)	Wudalianchi city	五大连池市	Wǔdàliánchí Shì	231182	BAS
Heihe city 黑河市; Hēihé Shì (2311 / HEK)	Nenjiang city	嫩江市	Nènjiāng shì	231183	WDL
Suihua city 绥化市; Suíhuà Shì (2312 / SUH)	Beilin District	北林区	Běilín Qū	231202	BEL
Suihua city 绥化市; Suíhuà Shì (2312 / SUH)	Wangkui County	望奎县	Wàngkuí Xiàn	231221	WKI
Suihua city 绥化市; Suíhuà Shì (2312 / SUH)	Lanxi County	兰西县	Lánxī Xiàn	231222	LXT
Suihua city 绥化市; Suíhuà Shì (2312 / SUH)	Qinggang County	青冈县	Qīnggāng Xiàn	231223	QGG
Suihua city 绥化市; Suíhuà Shì (2312 / SUH)	Qing'an County	庆安县	Qìng'ān Xiàn	231224	QAN
Suihua city 绥化市; Suíhuà Shì (2312 / SUH)	Mingshui County	明水县	Míngshuǐ Xiàn	231225	MSU
Suihua city 绥化市; Suíhuà Shì (2312 / SUH)	Suileng County	绥棱县	Suíléng Xiàn	231226	SLG
Suihua city 绥化市; Suíhuà Shì (2312 / SUH)	Anda city	安达市	Āndá Shì	231281	ADA
Suihua city 绥化市; Suíhuà Shì (2312 / SUH)	Zhaodong city	肇东市	Zhàodōng Shì	231282	ZDS
Suihua city 绥化市; Suíhuà Shì (2312 / SUH)	Hailun city	海伦市	Hǎilún Shì	231283	HLU
Daxing'anling Prefecture 大兴安岭地区; Dàxīng'ānlǐng Dìqū (2327 / DHL)	Jiagedaqi Administrative Zone (Note: These administrative zones within Daxing'anling are not formal administrative subdivisions recognized by the Ministry of Civil Affairs.) (Note: Nominally part of Oroqin Autonomous Banner, Inner Mongolia. Not formally part of Heilongjiang province.)	加格达奇行政区	Jiāgédáqí Xíngzhèngqū	232700	
Daxing'anling Prefecture 大兴安岭地区; Dàxīng'ānlǐng Dìqū (2327 / DHL)	Songling Administrative Zone	松岭行政区	Sōnglǐng Xíngzhèngqū	232700	
Daxing'anling Prefecture 大兴安岭地区; Dàxīng'ānlǐng Dìqū (2327 / DHL)	Xinlin Administrative Zone (Note: Nominally part of Huma County.)	新林行政区	Xīnlín Xíngzhèngqū	232700	
Daxing'anling Prefecture 大兴安岭地区; Dàxīng'ānlǐng Dìqū (2327 / DHL)	Huzhong Administrative Zone	呼中行政区	Hūzhōng Xíngzhèngqū	232700	
Daxing'anling Prefecture 大兴安岭地区; Dàxīng'ānlǐng Dìqū (2327 / DHL)	Mohe city	漠河市	Mòhé Shì	232701	
Daxing'anling Prefecture 大兴安岭地区; Dàxīng'ānlǐng Dìqū (2327 / DHL)	Huma County	呼玛县	Hūmǎ Xiàn	232721	HUM
Daxing'anling Prefecture 大兴安岭地区; Dàxīng'ānlǐng Dìqū (2327 / DHL)	Tahe County	塔河县	Tǎhé Xiàn	232722	TAH

== Recent changes in administrative divisions ==
Date	Before	After	Note	Reference
1970-02-21	parts of Hulunbuir League	Heihe Prefecture	transferred	
1970-02-21	↳ parts of Oroqen Banner (Aut.)	↳ Daxing'anling Special District	transferred	
1970-02-21	↳ parts of Oroqen Banner (Aut.)	◎ Jiagedaqi Forestry Area	established	
1970-04-01	Yichun (P-City)	Yichun Prefecture	reorganized	
1970-04-01	Yichun (P-City)	Yichun (PC-City)	established	
1970-04-01	↳ Yichun District	◎ Yichun District	transferred	
1970-04-01	↳ Nancha District	◎ Nancha District	transferred	
1970-04-01	↳ Wuying District	◎ Wuying District	transferred	
1970-04-01	↳ Dailing District	◎ Dailing District	transferred	
1970-04-01	↳ Cuilian District	◎ Cuilian District	transferred	
1970-04-01	↳ Meixi District	◎ Meixi District	transferred	
1970-04-01	↳ Xinqing District	◎ Xinqing District	transferred	
1970-04-01	↳ Dafeng District	◎ Dafeng District	transferred	
1970-04-01	↳ Wuminhe District	◎ Wuminhe District	transferred	
1970-04-01	↳ Shangganling District	◎ Shangganling District	transferred	
1970-04-01	↳ Youhao District	◎ Youhao District	transferred	
1970-04-01	↳ Dongfeng District, Yichun	◎ Dongfeng District, Yichun	transferred	
1970-04-01	↳ Hongxing District	◎ Hongxing District	transferred	
1970-04-01	↳ Wuyiling District	◎ Wuyiling District	transferred	
1970-04-01	↳ Xilin District	◎ Xilin District	transferred	
1970-04-01	parts of Heihe Prefecture	Yichun Prefecture	transferred	
1970-04-01	↳ Jiayin County	↳ Jiayin County	transferred	
1970-04-01	parts of Suihua Prefecture	Yichun Prefecture	transferred	
1970-04-01	↳ Tieli County	↳ Tieli County	transferred	
1970-04-01	parts of Heihe Prefecture	Daxing'anling Prefecture	established	
1970-04-01	↳ Daxing'anling Special Prefecture	Daxing'anling Prefecture	disestablished	
1970-04-01	↳ Songling Forestry Area	◎ Songling Forestry Area	transferred	
1970-04-01	↳ Xinlin Forestry Area	◎ Xinlin Forestry Area	transferred	
1970-04-01	↳ Huzhong Forestry Area	◎ Huzhong Forestry Area	transferred	
1970-04-01	↳ Tahe Forestry Area	◎ Tahe Forestry Area	transferred	
1970-04-01	↳ Jiagedaqi Forestry Area	◎ Jiagedaqi Forestry Area	transferred	
1970-04-01	↳ parts of Oroqen Banner (Aut.)	◎ Dayangshu Forestry Area	transferred	
1970-04-01	parts of Heihe Prefecture	Daxing'anling Prefecture	established	
1970-04-01	↳ Huma County	↳ Huma County	transferred	
1970-04-01	parts of Hulunbuir League	Daxing'anling Prefecture	transferred	
1970-04-01	↳ Morindawa Banner (Aut.)	Morindawa Banner (Aut.)	transferred	
1970-04-01	↳ Evenk Banner (Aut.)	Evenk Banner (Aut.)	transferred	
1970-04-01	parts of Nenjiang Prefecture	Heihe Prefecture	transferred	
1970-04-01	↳ Nenjiang County	↳ Nenjiang County	transferred	
1970-04-01	parts of Mudanjiang Prefecture	Songhuajiang Prefecture	transferred	
1970-04-01	↳ Shangzhi County	↳ Shangzhi County	transferred	
1970-04-01	↳ Fangzheng County	↳ Fangzheng County	transferred	
1970-04-01	↳ Yanshou County	↳ Yanshou County	transferred	
1970-04-01	parts of Hejiang Prefecture	Mudanjiang Prefecture	transferred	
1970-04-01	↳ Hulin County	↳ Hulin County	transferred	
1970-04-01	Qitaihe Special District	Qitaihe (PC-City)	established	
1970-10-02	parts of Jidong County	Chengzihe District	established	
1970-10-02	◎ Dong'an District	◎ Dongfeng District, Mudanjiang	established	
1970-10-02	◎ Xi'an District	◎ Xianfeng District, Mudanjiang	established	
1971-20-11	◎ parts of Tahe Forestry Area	◎ Amur Forestry Area	established	
1972-08-01	Binjiang District	Daoli District	disestablished & merged into	
1972-08-01	Binjiang District	Daowai District	disestablished & merged into	
1972-09-22	Xinshu District	Pingfang District	renamed	
1972-09-22	parts of Tangyuan County	Jiao District, Jiamusi	established	
1973-03-01	Youyi County	Jixian County	merged into	
1973-03-01	◎ parts of Tahe District	◎ Gulian District	established	
1974-07-02	Sartu (CC-Town)	Sartu District	established	
1974-07-02	Longfeng (CC-Town)	Longfeng District	established	
1974-07-02	Ranghulu (CC-Town)	Ranghulu District	established	
1975-05-15	parts of Dongning County	Suifenhe (PC-City)	established	
1975-03-15	◎ parts of Tahe Forestry Area	◎ Tuqiang Forestry Area	established	
1975-09-30	◎ Dayangshu Forestry Area	◎ Songling Forestry Area	merged into	
1978-01-27	Ranghulu District	Sartu District	merged into	
1979-05-30	parts of Heilongjiang Province	Inner Mongolia A.R.	provincial transferred	
1979-05-30	Hulunbuir League	Hulunbuir League	transferred	
1979-05-30	↳ Butha Banner	↳ Butha Banner	transferred	
1979-05-30	↳ Arun Banner	↳ Arun Banner	transferred	
1979-05-30	↳ Xuguit Banner	↳ Xuguit Banner	transferred	
1979-05-30	↳ Jalaid Banner	↳ Jalaid Banner	transferred	
1979-05-30	↳ Ergun Right Banner	↳ Ergun Right Banner	transferred	
1979-05-30	↳ Ergun Left Banner	↳ Ergun Left Banner	transferred	
1979-05-30	↳ Old Barag Banner	↳ Old Barag Banner	transferred	
1979-05-30	↳ New Barag Left Banner	↳ New Barag Left Banner	transferred	
1979-05-30	↳ New Barag Right Banner	↳ New Barag Right Banner	transferred	
1979-05-30	↳ Oroqen Banner (Aut.)	↳ Oroqen Banner (Aut.)	transferred	
1979-05-30	↳ Hailar (PC-City)	↳ Hailar (PC-City)	transferred	
1979-05-30	↳ Manzhouli (PC-City)	↳ Manzhouli (PC-City)	transferred	
1979-05-30	parts of Daxing'anling Prefecture	Hulunbuir League	transferred	
1979-05-30	↳ Evenk Banner (Aut.)	↳ Evenk Banner (Aut.)	transferred	
1979-05-30	↳ Morindawa Banner (Aut.)	↳ Morindawa Banner (Aut.)	transferred	
1979-11-06	parts of Longfeng District	Datong District	established	
1979-12-14	Yichun Prefecture	Yichun (P-City)	reorganized	
1979-12-14	Anda (P-City)	Daqing (P-City)	renamed	
1980-03-10	Jiao District, Qiqihar	Meilisi District	renamed	
1980-03-10	parts of Sartu District	Ranghulu District	established	
1980-03-10	parts of Datong District	Honggang District	established	
1980-04-15	Shuangyashan (P-City) city district	Jianshan District	established	
1980-04-15	Shuangyashan (P-City) city district	Lingdong District	established	
1980-04-15	Shuangyashan (P-City) city district	Lingxi District	established	
1980-04-15	Shuangyashan (P-City) city district	Sifangtai District	established	
1980-04-15	Shuangyashan (P-City) city district	Baoshan District	established	
1980-04-15	◎ parts of Dongfeng District, Mudanjiang	◎ Yangming District	established	
1980-04-15	◎ parts of Aimin District	◎ Yangming District	established	
1980-04-15	◎ parts of Jiao District, Mudanjiang	◎ Yangming District	established	
1980-04-15	◎ Dongfeng District, Mudanjiang	◎ Dong'an District	renamed	
1980-04-15	◎ Xianfeng District, Mudanjiang	◎ Xi'an District	renamed	
1980-04-24	Dongfeng District, Jixi	Nanshan District, Jixi	merged	
1980-04-24	Yuejin District	Nanshan District, Jixi	merged	
1980-04-24	Qunli District	Dongshan District, Jixi	merged	
1980-04-24	Fanxiu District	Dongshan District, Jixi	merged	
1980-04-24	Hongwei District, Jixi	Xingshan District	renamed	
1980-04-24	Hongqi District, Jixi	Xing'an District	renamed	
1980-09-04	parts of Aihui County	Heihe (PC-City)	established	
1981-05-14	parts of Huma County	Tahe County	established	
1981-05-14	◎ Tahe Forestry Area	Tahe County	merged into	
1981-05-14	parts of Huma County	Mohe	established	
1981-05-14	◎ Gulian Forestry Area	Mohe	merged into	
1981-05-14	◎ Tuqiang Forestry Area	Mohe	merged into	
1981-05-14	◎ Amur Forestry Area	Mohe	merged into	
1982-12-18	Suihua County	Suihua (PC-City)	reorganized	
1982-12-18	Bei'an County	Bei'an (PC-City)	reorganized	
1982-12-18	Bei'an County	Tongbei County	established	
1983-01-18	all Province-controlled city (P-City) → Prefecture-level city (PL-City)			Civil Affairs Announcement
1983-01-18	all Prefecture-controlled city (PC-City) → County-level city (CL-City)			Civil Affairs Announcement
1983-04-28	Aihui County	Heihe (CL-City)	merged into	
1983-04-28	Tongbei County	Bei'an (CL-City)	merged into	
1983-10-03	Mudanjiang Prefecture	Mudanjiang (PL-City)	reorganized	
1983-10-03	↳ Mudanjiang (CL-City)	Mudanjiang (PL-City)	disestablished	
1983-10-03	◎ Aimin District	↳ Aimin District	transferred	
1983-10-03	◎ Yangming District	↳ Yangming District	transferred	
1983-10-03	◎ Dong'an District	↳ Dong'an District	transferred	
1983-10-03	◎ Xi'an District	↳ Xi'an District	transferred	
1983-10-03	◎ Jiao District, Mudanjiang	↳ Jiao District, Mudanjiang	transferred	
1983-10-03	parts of Mudanjiang Prefecture	Jixi (PL-City)	transferred	
1983-10-03	↳ Jidong County	↳ Jidong County	transferred	
1983-10-03	parts of Songhuajiang Prefecture	Harbin (PL-City)	transferred	
1983-10-03	↳ Hulan County	↳ Hulan County	transferred	
1983-10-03	↳ Acheng County	↳ Acheng County	transferred	
1983-10-08	parts of Hejiang Prefecture	Jiamusi (PL-City)	established	
1983-10-08	↳ Jiamusi (CL-City)	Jiamusi (PL-City)	disestablished	
1983-10-08	◎ Xiangyang District	↳ Xiangyang District	transferred	
1983-10-08	◎ Yonghong District	↳ Yonghong District	transferred	
1983-10-08	◎ Qianjin District	↳ Qianjin District	transferred	
1983-10-08	◎ Dongfeng District, Jiamusi	↳ Dongfeng District, Jiamusi	transferred	
1983-10-08	◎ Jiao District, Jiamusi	↳ Jiao District, Jiamusi	transferred	
1983-10-08	↳ Xiangyang District	↳ Xiangyang District	transferred	
1983-10-08	↳ Yonghong District	↳ Yonghong District	transferred	
1983-10-08	↳ Qianjin District	↳ Qianjin District	transferred	
1983-10-08	↳ Dongfeng District	↳ Dongfeng District	transferred	
1983-10-08	↳ Jiao District, Jiamusi	↳ Jiao District, Jiamusi	transferred	
1983-10-08	parts of Hejiang Prefecture	Qitaihe (PL-City) city district	established	
1983-10-08	↳ Qitaihe (CL-City)	Qitaihe (PL-City) city district	reorganized	
1983-10-08	↳ Boli County	↳ Boli County	transferred	
1983-10-08	parts of Dedu County	Wudalianchi (CL-City)	established	
1983-12-24	Wuminhe District	Wumahe District	renamed	
1983-12-24	Dongfeng District, Yichun	Tangwanghe District	renamed	
1983-12-24	Dafeng District	Jinshantun District	renamed	
1983-12-24	Jinhua District	Nianzishan District	renamed	
1984-11-17	Anda County	Anda (CL-City)	reorganized	
1984-12-05	parts of Jixian County	Youyi County	established	
1984-12-15	Nenjiang Prefecture	Qiqihar (PL-City)	merged into	
1984-12-15	Hejiang Prefecture	Jiamusi (PL-City)	merged into	
1984-12-15	Qitaihe (PL-City) city district	Xinxing District	established	
1984-12-15	Qitaihe (PL-City) city district	Taoshan District	established	
1984-12-15	Qitaihe (PL-City) city district	Qiezihe District	established	
1986-07-01	parts of Ning'an County	Jingpohu (CL-City)	established	
1986-09-08	Zhaodong County	Zhaodong (CL-City)	established	
1987-02-24	Tongjiang County	Tongjiang (CL-City)	established	
1987-02-24	Acheng County	Acheng (CL-City)	established	
1987-11-06	parts of Jiamusi (PL-City)	Shuangyashan (PL-City)	transferred	
1987-11-06	↳ Jixian County	↳ Jixian County	transferred	
1987-11-06	Lingxi District	Lingdong District	merged into	
1987-11-06	parts of Jiamusi (PL-City)	Hegang (PL-City)	transferred	
1987-11-06	↳ Luobei County	↳ Luobei County	transferred	
1987-11-06	↳ Suibin County	↳ Suibin County	transferred	
1988-07-11	Meilisi District	Meilisi Daur District	renamed	
1988-08-30	Fujin County	Fujin (CL-City)	reorganized	
1988-09-13	Tieli County	Tieli (CL-City)	reorganized	
1988-08-14	Shuangcheng County	Shuangcheng (CL-City)	reorganized	
1988-08-14	Mishan County	Mishan (CL-City)	reorganized	
1988-11-17	Shangzhi County	Shangzhi (CL-City)	reorganized	
1989-12-23	Hailun County	Hailun (CL-City)	reorganized	
1991-02-02	parts of Jiamusi (PL-City)	Harbin (PL-City)	transferred	State Council [1991]4
1991-02-02	↳ Yilan County	↳ Yilan County	transferred	State Council [1991]4
1991-02-02	parts of Jiamusi (PL-City)	Shuangyashan (PL-City)	transferred	State Council [1991]4
1991-02-02	↳ Youyi County	↳ Youyi County	transferred	State Council [1991]4
1991-02-02	↳ Baoqing County	↳ Baoqing County	transferred	State Council [1991]4
1991-02-02	parts of Songhuajiang Prefecture	Harbin (PL-City)	transferred	State Council [1991]4
1991-02-02	↳ Fangzheng County	↳ Fangzheng County	transferred	State Council [1991]4
1991-02-02	↳ Bin County	↳ Bin County	transferred	State Council [1991]4
1992-07-28	Hailin County	Hailin (CL-City)	reorganized	Civil Affairs [1992]90
1992-09-02	Nehe County	Nehe (CL-City)	reorganized	Civil Affairs [1992]97
1992-08-21	parts of Songhuajiang Prefecture	Daqing (PL-City)	transferred	
1992-08-21	↳ Zhaozhou County	↳ Zhaozhou County	transferred	
1992-08-21	↳ Zhaoyuan County	↳ Zhaoyuan County	transferred	
1992-08-21	parts of Qiqihar (PL-City)	Daqing (PL-City)	transferred	
1992-08-21	↳ Lindian County	↳ Lindian County	transferred	
1992-08-21	↳ Dorbod County (Aut.)	↳ Dorbod County (Aut.)	transferred	
1993-02-08	Heihe Prefecture	Heihe (PL-City)	reorganized	State Council [1993]12
1993-02-08	Heihe (CL-City)	Aihui District	reorganized	State Council [1993]12
1993-02-12	Ning'an County	Ning'an (CL-City)	reorganized	Civil Affairs [1993]9
1993-06-01	Wuchang County	Wuchang (CL-City)	reorganized	Civil Affairs [1993]117
1993-06-14	parts of Mudanjiang (PL-City)	Jixi (PL-City)	transferred	
1993-06-14	↳ Hulin County	↳ Hulin County	transferred	
1993-07-05	parts of Jiamusi (PL-City)	Shuangyashan (PL-City)	transferred	
1993-07-05	↳ Raohe County	↳ Raohe County	transferred	
1995-03-07	Muling County	Muling (CL-City)	reorganized	Civil Affairs [1995]26
1996-01-31	Dedou County	Wudalianchi (CL-City)	merged into	Civil Affairs [1996]19
1996-08-11	Songhuajiang Prefecture	Harbin (PL-City)	merged into	State Council [1996]64
1996-10-11	Hulin County	Hulin (CL-City)	reorganized	Civil Affairs [1996]77
1997-09-30	Jiao District, Mudanjiang	Dong'an District	disestablished & merged into	State Council [1997]90
1997-09-30	Jiao District, Mudanjiang	Yangming District	disestablished & merged into	State Council [1997]90
1997-09-30	Jiao District, Mudanjiang	Aimin District	disestablished & merged into	State Council [1997]90
1997-09-30	Jiao District, Mudanjiang	Xi'an District	disestablished & merged into	State Council [1997]90
1999-12-28	Suihua Prefecture	Suihua (PL-City)	reorganized	State Council [1999]154
1999-12-28	Suihua (CL-City)	Beilin District	reorganized	State Council [1999]154
2004-02-04	Taiping District	Daowai District	merged into	State Council [2004]10
2004-02-04	parts of Daowai District	Songbei District	established	State Council [2004]10
2004-02-04	Hulan County	Hulan District	reorganized	State Council [2004]10
2006-07-27	Yonghong District	Jiao District, Jiamusi	merged into	State Council [2006]63
2006-08-15	Dongli District	Xiangfang District	reorganized	State Council [2006]73
2006-08-15	Acheng (CL-City)	Acheng District	reorganized	State Council [2006]73
2014-05-02	Shuangcheng (CL-City)	Shuangcheng District	reorganized	State Council [2014]55
2015-12-15	Dongning County	Dongning (CL-City)	reorganized	State Council [2015]361
2016-01-15	Fuyuan County	Fuyuan (CL-City)	reorganized	Civil Affairs [2016]14
2018-02-22	Mohe County	Mohe (CL-City)	reorganized	Civil Affairs [2018]50
2019-06-29	Yichun District	Yimei District	merged & established	State Council [2019]63
2019-06-29	Meixi District	Yimei District	merged & established	State Council [2019]63
2019-06-29	Wumahe District	Wucui District	disestablished & established	State Council [2019]63
2019-06-29	Cuiluan District	Wucui District	disestablished & established	State Council [2019]63
2019-06-29	Jinshantun District	Jinlin District	disestablished & established	State Council [2019]63
2019-06-29	Xilin District	Jinlin District	disestablished & established	State Council [2019]63
2019-06-29	Shangganling District	Youhao District	merged into	State Council [2019]63
2019-06-29	Tangwanghe District	Tangwang County	disestablished & established	State Council [2019]63
2019-06-29	Wuyiling District	Tangwang County	disestablished & established	State Council [2019]63
2019-06-29	Wuying District	Fenglin County	disestablished & established	State Council [2019]63
2019-06-29	Hongxing District	Fenglin County	disestablished & established	State Council [2019]63
2019-06-29	Xinqing District	Fenglin County	disestablished & established	State Council [2019]63
2019-06-29	Dailing District	Dajingshan County	reorganized	State Council [2019]63
2019-06-29	parts of Tieli (CL-City)	Dajingshan County	reorganized	State Council [2019]63
2019-06-29	Nancha District	Nancha County	reorganized	State Council [2019]63
2019-07-20	Nenjiang County	Nenjiang (CL-City)	reorganized	Civil Affairs [2019]75

== Population composition ==
=== Prefectures ===
Prefecture	2010	2000
Harbin	10,635,971	9,413,359
Daqing	2,904,532	
Hegang	1,058,665	
Heihe	1,673,898	
Jiamusi	2,552,097	
Jixi	1,862,161	
Mudanjiang	2,798,723	
Qiqihar	5,367,003	
Qitaihe	920,419	
Shuangyashan	1,462,626	
Suihua	5,416,439	
Yichun	1,148,126	
Daxing'anling	511,564	

=== Counties ===
Name	Prefecture	2010
Daoli	Harbin	923,762
Nangang	Harbin	1,343,857
Daowai	Harbin	906,421
Xiangfang	Harbin	916,408
Pingfang	Harbin	190,253
Songbei	Harbin	236,848
Hulan	Harbin	764,534
Acheng	Harbin	596,856
Yilan	Harbin	388,319
Fangzheng	Harbin	203,853
Bin(xian)	Harbin	551,271
Bayan	Harbin	590,555
Tonghe	Harbin	210,650
Mulan	Harbin	277,685
Yanshou	Harbin	242,455
Shuangcheng	Harbin	825,634
Shangzhi	Harbin	585,386
Wuchang	Harbin	881,224
Longsha	Qiqihar	354,987
Jianhua	Qiqihar	292,579
Tiefeng	Qiqihar	331,951
Ang'angxi	Qiqihar	80,109
Fularji	Qiqihar	256,159
Nianzishan	Qiqihar	72,151
Meilisi	Qiqihar	165,852
Longjiang	Qiqihar	572,764
Yi'an	Qiqihar	480,035
Tailai	Qiqihar	302,027
Gannan	Qiqihar	368,734
Fuyu	Qiqihar	276,537
Keshan	Qiqihar	403,175
Kedong	Qiqihar	264,285
Baiquan	Qiqihar	519,766
Nehe	Qiqihar	625,892
Jiguan	Jixi	365,376
Hengshan	Jixi	160,185
Didao	Jixi	103,646
Lishu	Jixi	76,361
Chengzihe	Jixi	127,290
Mashan	Jixi	30,097
Jidong	Jixi	273,871
Hulin	Jixi	317,884
Mishan	Jixi	407,451
Xiangyang	Hegang	110,916
Gongnong	Hegang	140,070
Nanshan	Hegang	119,047
Xing'an	Hegang	74,396
Dongshan	Hegang	175,239
Xingshan	Hegang	44,803
Luobei	Hegang	220,131
Suibin	Hegang	174,063
Jianshan	Shuangyashan	221,767
Lingdong	Shuangyashan	81,882
Sifangtai	Shuangyashan	67,704
Baoshan	Shuangyashan	128,153
Jixian	Shuangyashan	319,893
Youyi	Shuangyashan	123,435
Baoqing	Shuangyashan	419,708
Raohe	Shuangyashan	141,884
Sartu	Daqing	328,808
Longfeng	Daqing	352,404
Ranghulu	Daqing	564,534
Honggang	Daqing	169,522
Datong	Daqing	234,557
Zhaozhou	Daqing	387,463
Zhaoyuan	Daqing	388,828
Lindian	Daqing	244,578
Dorbod	Daqing	233,838
Youhao	Yichun	53,409
Yimei	Yichun	not established
Wucui	Yichun	not established
Jinlin	Yichun	not established
Jiayin	Yichun	68,566
Nancha	Yichun	118,060
Dajingshan	Yichun	32,256
Tangwang	Yichun	not established
Fenglin	Yichun	not established
Tieli	Yichun	350,358
Xiangyang	Jiamusi	233,855
Qianjin	Jiamusi	171,530
Dongfeng	Jiamusi	161,740
Jiao(qu)	Jiamusi	314,586
Huanan	Jiamusi	468,698
Huachuan	Jiamusi	202,827
Tangyuan	Jiamusi	255,211
Fuyuan	Jiamusi	126,694
Tongjiang	Jiamusi	179,791
Fujin	Jiamusi	437,165
Xinxing	Qitaihe	236,768
Taoshan	Qitaihe	230,293
Qiezihe	Qitaihe	153,874
Boli	Qitaihe	299,484
Dong'an	Mudanjiang	200,160
Yangming	Mudanjiang	240,214
Aimin	Mudanjiang	275,289
Xi'an	Mudanjiang	249,491
Dongning	Mudanjiang	200,716
Linkou	Mudanjiang	368,956
Suifenhe	Mudanjiang	132,315
Hailin	Mudanjiang	400,859
Ning'an	Mudanjiang	437,452
Muling	Mudanjiang	293,271
Aihui	Heihe	211,313
Nenjiang	Heihe	495,519
Xunke	Heihe	101,411
Sunwu	Heihe	102,821
Bei'an	Heihe	436,444
Wudalianchi	Heihe	326,390
Beilin	Suihua	877,682
Wangkui	Suihua	428,760
Lanxi	Suihua	454,526
Qinggang	Suihua	474,553
Mingshui	Suihua	320,985
Qing'an	Suihua	382,416
Suileng	Suihua	331,705
Zhaodong	Suihua	903,171
Anda	Suihua	472,716
Hailun	Suihua	769,925
Jiagedaqi	Daxing'anling	154,363
Songling	Daxing'anling	33,555
Xinlin	Daxing'anling	50,859
Huzhong	Daxing'anling	45,039
Huma	Daxing'anling	51,861
Tahe	Daxing'anling	92,473
Mohe	Daxing'anling	83,414
Yichun (disestablished)	Yichun	146,074
Xilin (disestablished)	Yichun	51,938
Cuiluan (disestablished)	Yichun	44,976
Xinqing (disestablished)	Yichun	43,054
Meixi (disestablished)	Yichun	40,697
Jinshantun (disestablished)	Yichun	39,917
Wuying (disestablished)	Yichun	33,980
Wumahe (disestablished)	Yichun	31,391
Tangwanghe (disestablished)	Yichun	30,980
Wuyiling (disestablished)	Yichun	21,145
Hongxing (disestablished)	Yichun	21,838
Shangganling (disestablished)	Yichun	19,487
