= Xin'an Subdistrict =

Xin'an Subdistrict may refer to:

- Xin'an Subdistrict, Shenzhen, in Bao'an District
- Xin'an Subdistrict, Mudanjiang, in Dong'an District, Mudanjiang, Heilongjiang
- Xin'an Subdistrict, Qitaihe, in Xinxing District, Qitaihe, Heilongjiang
- Xin'an Subdistrict, Shuangyashan, in Baoshan District, Shuangyashan, Heilongjiang
- Xin'an Subdistrict, Wuxi, in Binhu District, Wuxi, Jiangsu
- Xin'an Subdistrict, Huichun, Jilin
- Xin'an Subdistrict, Jilin City, in Longtan District, Jilin City
- Xin'an Subdistrict, Anqiu, Shandong
- Xin'an Subdistrict, Qingdao (辛安街道), in Huangdao District
- Xin'an Subdistrict, Quzhou (信安街道), in Kecheng District, Quzhou, Zhejiang
