= DFQ =

DFQ can refer to:

- Dongfeng District, a district of Jiamusi, China; see List of administrative divisions of Heilongjiang
- Nudiviridae, a family of viruses that infect insects and crustaceans, per Catalogue of Life identifier
- Differential equation, a type of mathematical equation that relates a function to its derivative(s)
- domi forisque, as abbreviated; see List of medieval abbreviations
