= DWQ =

DWQ can refer to:

- Pannariaceae, a family of fungi, by Catalogue of Life identifier
- Daowai District, a district of Harbin, China; see List of administrative divisions of Heilongjiang
- Dar al-Watha'iq al-Qawmiyy, (Arabic: الأرشيف الوطني, romanized: National Archives) the Arabic name for the Egyptian National Archives
