= Streptomyces zhaozhouensis =

Scientific classification
- Domain: Bacteria
- Kingdom: Bacillati
- Phylum: Actinomycetota
- Class: Actinomycetia
- Order: Streptomycetales
- Family: Streptomycetaceae
- Genus: Streptomyces
- Species: S. zhaozhouensis

Binomial name
- Streptomyces zhaozhouensis He et al. 2014

Type strain
- CGMCC 4.7095, DSM 42101, NEAU-LZS-5

Species of bacterium

Streptomyces zhaozhouensis is a bacterium species from the genus of Streptomyces which has been isolated from the surface of a leaf of the plant candelabra aloe in Zhaozhou in the Heilongjiang Province in China.

== See also ==
- List of Streptomyces species
