= Songjiang =

Songjiang, from the Chinese for "Pine River" and formerly romanized as Sungkiang, usually refers to one of the following areas within the municipal limits of Shanghai:

- Songjiang, Shanghai (松江区, Songjiang qu), a present suburban district of Shanghai
- Songjiang County (松江縣, Songjiang xian), a former name of the present Songjiang District
- Songjiang Prefecture (松江府, Songjiang fu), the area of Jiangsu province administering much of Shanghai under imperial China
- Songjiang Special Administration District (松江特別區, Songjiang tebiequ), the historic district of the Republic of China administering much of Shanghai

It may also refer to the following locations in China:

- Songjiang Province (松江省) a former province located within present-day Heilongjiang
- Songjiang (松江乡), in Dongfeng District, Jiamusi, Heilongjiang
- Songjiang (松江镇) in Hengnan County, Hunan
- Songjiang (松江镇) in Antu County, Jilin
- Songjiang (松江镇) in Jiaohe, Jilin
- Songjiang (松江乡), in Fusong County, Jilin

== See also ==
- Songjiang Nanjing metro station, a metro station of the Taipei Metro
- Song Jiang for the real and legendary Chinese bandit and revolt leader
- Matsue, for the Japanese city written with the same Chinese characters
