= Fenggang =

Fenggang may refer to the following locations in China:

- Fenggang County (凤冈县), Guizhou

== Towns ==
- Fenggang, Yihuang County (凤冈镇), Jiangxi

Written as "凤岗镇":

- Fenggang, Dongguan, Guangdong
- Fenggang, Huaiji County, Guangdong
- Fenggang, Heilongjiang, in Youyi County
- Fenggang, Ganzhou, in Nankang, Jiangxi

== Subdistricts ==
- Fenggang Subdistrict, Sha County, Fujian
- Fenggang Subdistrict, Nangong, Hebei
