= Dongan District =

Dongan District may refer to:

- Dong'an District, Mudanjiang, Heilongjiang, China
- Dongan District, Anyang, Gyeonggi Province, South Korea
