= DQG =

DQG can refer to:

- Dhupguri railway station, a train station in Dhupguri, West Bengal, India
- dqg or g!x or gꞰx ([ᶢᵏǃᵡ]), a click consonant in the Juǀʼhoan language of Namibia and Botswana; see Click consonant#Variation among languages
- Orobanchaceae, a family of mostly parasitic plants, by Catalogue of Life identifier
- Daqing, a city in Heilongjiang province, China; see List of administrative divisions of Heilongjiang
