= Jiaoqu, Jiamusi =

Jiaoqu 郊区
- District
- Interactive map of Jiaoqu
- Coordinates: 46°48′36″N 130°19′38″E
- Country: People's Republic of China
- Province: Heilongjiang
- Prefecture-level city: Jiamusi

Area
  - Total: 792 km^{2} (306 sq mi)

Population (2010)
  - Total: 314,586
- Time zone: UTC+8 (China Standard)

Jiaoqu (simplified Chinese: 郊区; traditional Chinese: 郊區; pinyin: Jiāo Qū; lit. 'suburbs') is a suburban district of the city of Jiamusi, Heilongjiang, People's Republic of China.

== Administrative divisions ==
Jiao District is divided into 2 subdistricts, 7 towns and 4 townships.

2 subdistricts

- Jiaxi (佳西街道), Youyi (友谊街道)

7 towns

- Dalai (大来镇), Aoqi (敖其镇), Wangjiang (望江镇), Zhangfa (长发镇), Lianjiangkou (莲江口镇), Xigemu (西格木镇), Yanjiang (沿江镇)

4 townships

- Changqing (长青乡), Ping'an (平安乡), Sifeng (四丰乡), Qunsheng (群胜乡)
