= Suiling County =

Suiling County 绥棱县
- County
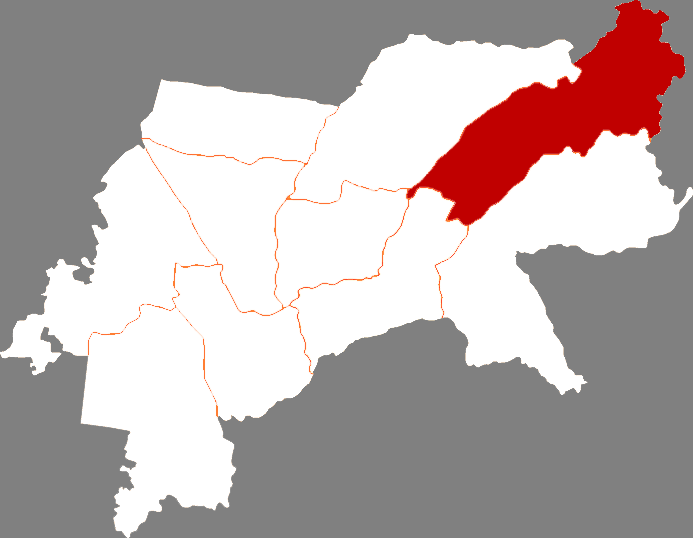
- Suiling in Suihua

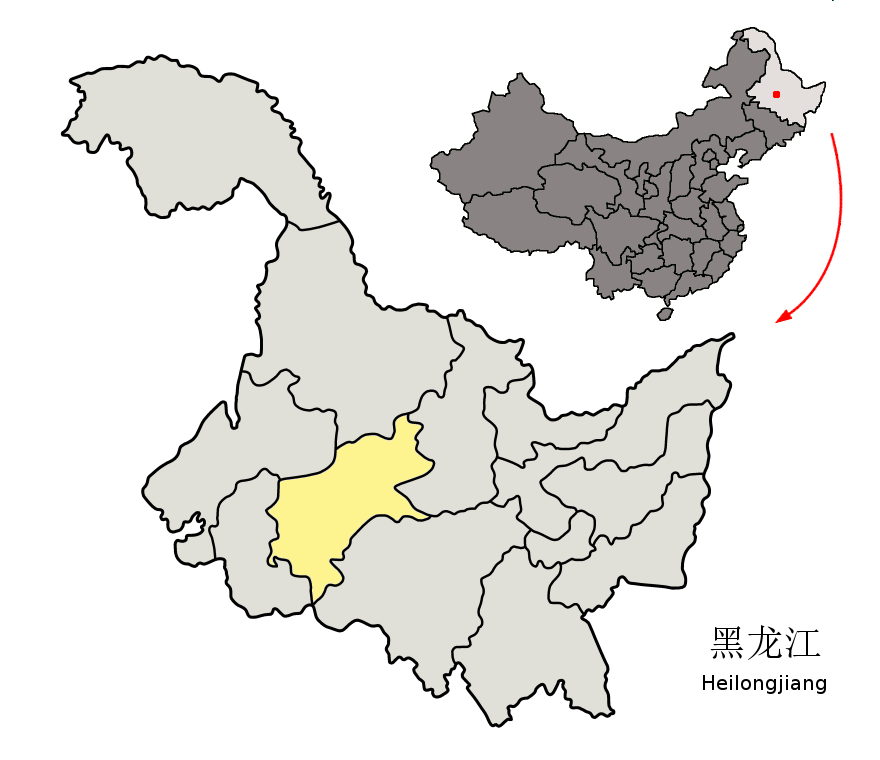
- Suihua in Heilongjiang
- Coordinates: 47°14′10″N 127°06′53″E
- Country: People's Republic of China
- Province: Heilongjiang
- Prefecture-level city: Suihua

Area
  - Total: 4,350.25 km^{2} (1,679.64 sq mi)

Population
  - Total: 331,343
  - Density: 76.1664/km^{2} (197.270/sq mi)
- Time zone: UTC+8 (China Standard)

Suiling County (simplified Chinese: 绥棱县; traditional Chinese: 綏稜縣; pinyin: Suílíng Xiàn) is a county of west-central Heilongjiang province, People's Republic of China. It is under the jurisdiction of the prefecture-level city of Suihua, and contains its northernmost point.

== Administrative divisions ==
Suiling County is divided into 4 subdistricts, 6 towns and 5 townships.

4 subdistricts

- Chezhan (车站街道), Jianshe (建设街道), Xibei (西北街道), Dongnan (东南街道)

6 towns

- Suiling (绥棱镇), Shangji (上集镇), Sihaidian (四海店镇), Shuangchahe (双岔河镇), Geshan (阁山镇), Changshan (长山镇)

5 townships

- Kaoshan (靠山乡), Houtou (后头乡), Keyinhe (克音河乡), Suizhong (绥中乡), Ni'erhe (泥尔河乡)

== Demographics ==
The population of the district was 315,306 in 1999.

== Climate ==
Climate data for Suiling, elevation 203 m (666 ft), (1991–2020 normals, extremes 1981–2010)
Month	Jan	Feb	Mar	Apr	May	Jun	Jul	Aug	Sep	Oct	Nov	Dec	Year
Record high °C (°F)	−2.1 (28.2)	4.1 (39.4)	19.3 (66.7)	28.6 (83.5)	33.4 (92.1)	37.7 (99.9)	36.4 (97.5)	35.0 (95.0)	31.8 (89.2)	24.7 (76.5)	14.0 (57.2)	3.2 (37.8)	37.7 (99.9)
Mean daily maximum °C (°F)	−15.6 (3.9)	−9.8 (14.4)	0.5 (32.9)	11.9 (53.4)	20.4 (68.7)	25.5 (77.9)	27.0 (80.6)	25.3 (77.5)	20.2 (68.4)	10.7 (51.3)	−2.6 (27.3)	−13.7 (7.3)	8.3 (47.0)
Daily mean °C (°F)	−21.5 (−6.7)	−16.3 (2.7)	−5.4 (22.3)	5.8 (42.4)	14.0 (57.2)	19.8 (67.6)	22.2 (72.0)	20.2 (68.4)	13.9 (57.0)	4.7 (40.5)	−7.7 (18.1)	−19.1 (−2.4)	2.5 (36.6)
Mean daily minimum °C (°F)	−27.3 (−17.1)	−23.1 (−9.6)	−11.5 (11.3)	−0.2 (31.6)	7.4 (45.3)	14.2 (57.6)	17.6 (63.7)	15.5 (59.9)	8.1 (46.6)	−0.6 (30.9)	−12.5 (9.5)	−24.2 (−11.6)	−3.1 (26.5)
Record low °C (°F)	−42.3 (−44.1)	−39.6 (−39.3)	−33.4 (−28.1)	−12.1 (10.2)	−4.9 (23.2)	3.3 (37.9)	9.1 (48.4)	5.1 (41.2)	−4.7 (23.5)	−17.2 (1.0)	−31.7 (−25.1)	−40.1 (−40.2)	−42.3 (−44.1)
Average precipitation mm (inches)	3.8 (0.15)	3.6 (0.14)	11.3 (0.44)	23.7 (0.93)	48.8 (1.92)	109.4 (4.31)	153.9 (6.06)	136.1 (5.36)	66.5 (2.62)	26.3 (1.04)	9.4 (0.37)	7.4 (0.29)	600.2 (23.63)
Average precipitation days (≥ 0.1 mm)	5.3	4.0	5.5	7.0	12.2	14.6	14.7	14.0	10.5	6.7	6.0	7.2	107.7
Average snowy days	7.5	6.2	7.0	2.8	0.1	0	0	0	0	2.0	6.9	9.6	42.1
Average relative humidity (%)	74	71	62	54	55	68	81	82	72	63	68	75	69
Mean monthly sunshine hours	185.2	212.3	262.0	246.5	272.8	259.6	250.9	247.8	237.2	207.0	174.1	161.3	2,716.7
Percentage possible sunshine	67	73	71	60	58	55	53	57	64	62	63	61	62
Source: China Meteorological Administration
