= Nanshan District, Hegang =

Nanshan District 南山区
- District
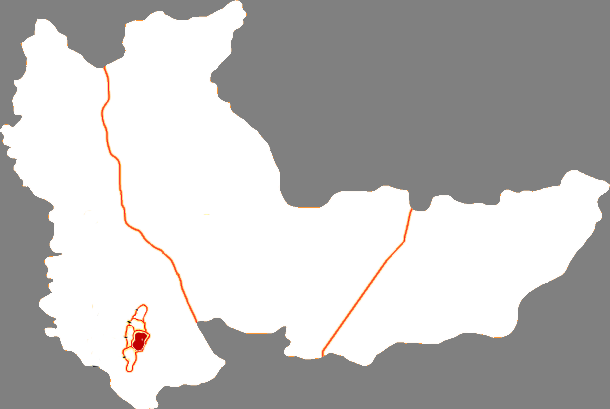
- Nanshan in Hegang

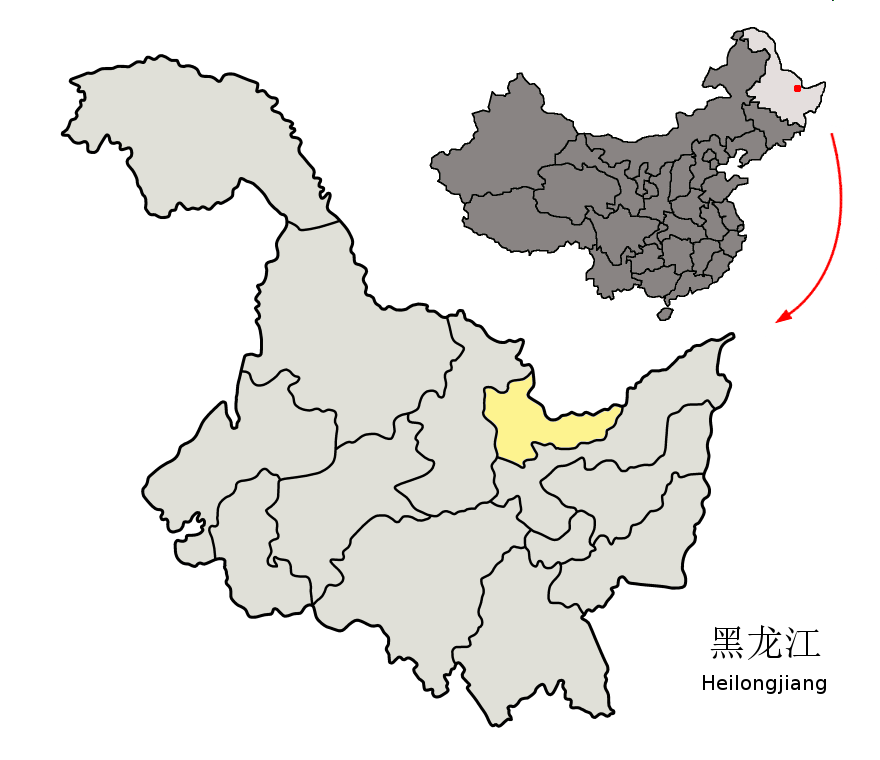
- Hegang in Heilongjiang
- Coordinates: 47°18′54″N 130°17′14″E
- Country: People's Republic of China
- Province: Heilongjiang
- Prefecture-level city: Hegang

Area
  - Total: 30 km^{2} (12 sq mi)

Population
  - Total: 119,047
  - Density: 4,000/km^{2} (10,000/sq mi)
- Time zone: UTC+8 (China Standard)

Nanshan District (Chinese: 南山区; pinyin: Nánshān Qū) is a district of the city of Hegang, Heilongjiang province, China.

== Administrative divisions ==
Nanshan District is divided into 6 subdistricts.

6 subdistricts

- Tiexi (铁西街道), Tiedong (铁东街道), Liuhao (六号街道), Dalu (大陆街道), Fuli (富力街道), Lulinshan (麓林山街道)
