= Meilisi Daur District =

Meilisi 梅里斯达斡尔族区
- District
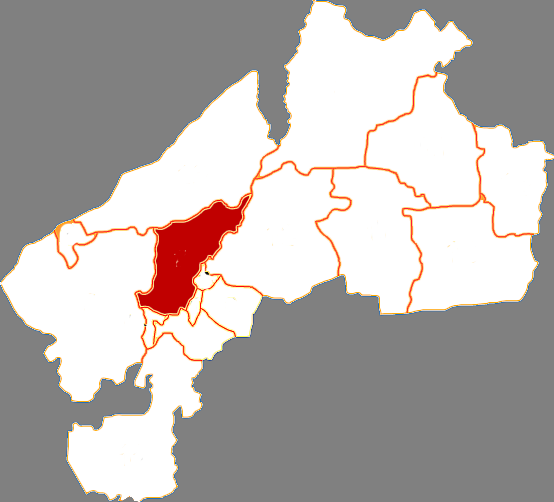
- Meilisi in Qiqihar

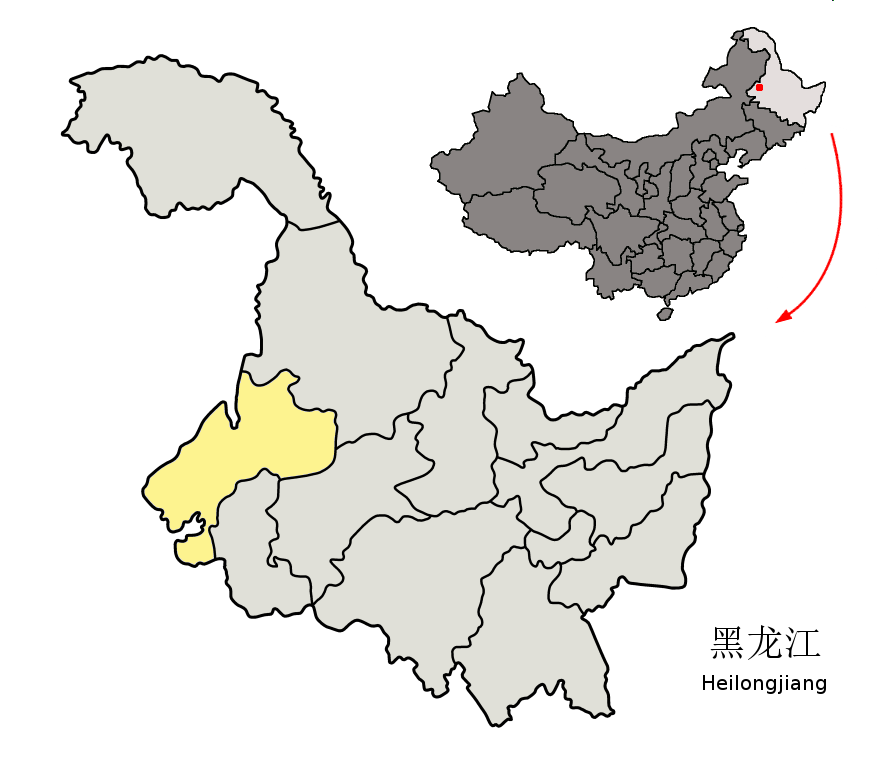
- Qiqihar in Heilongjiang
- Coordinates: 47°18′34″N 123°45′10″E
- Country: People's Republic of China
- Province: Heilongjiang
- Prefecture-level city: Qiqihar

Area
  - Total: 1,948 km^{2} (752 sq mi)

Population (2010)
  - Total: 165,852
  - Density: 85.14/km^{2} (220.5/sq mi)
- Time zone: UTC+8 (China Standard)
- Postal code: 161021

Meilisi Daur District (simplified Chinese: 梅里斯达斡尔族区; traditional Chinese: 梅里斯達斡爾族區; pinyin: Méilǐsī Dáwò'ěrzú Qū) is an outlying district of the city of Qiqihar, Heilongjiang Province, China. The population was 170,000.

== Administrative divisions ==
Meilisi Daur District is divided into 1 subdistrict, 4 towns, 1 ethnic town and 1 ethnic township.

1 subdistricts

- Meilisi (梅里斯街道)

4 towns

- Ya'ersai (雅尔塞镇), Dahudian (达呼店镇), Gonghe (共和镇), Meilisi (梅里斯镇)

1 ethnic town

- Woniutu Daur (卧牛吐达斡尔族镇)

1 ethnic township

- Manggetu Daur (莽格吐达斡尔族乡)
