= Huzhong District =

Huzhong 呼中(行政)区
- Administrative Zone
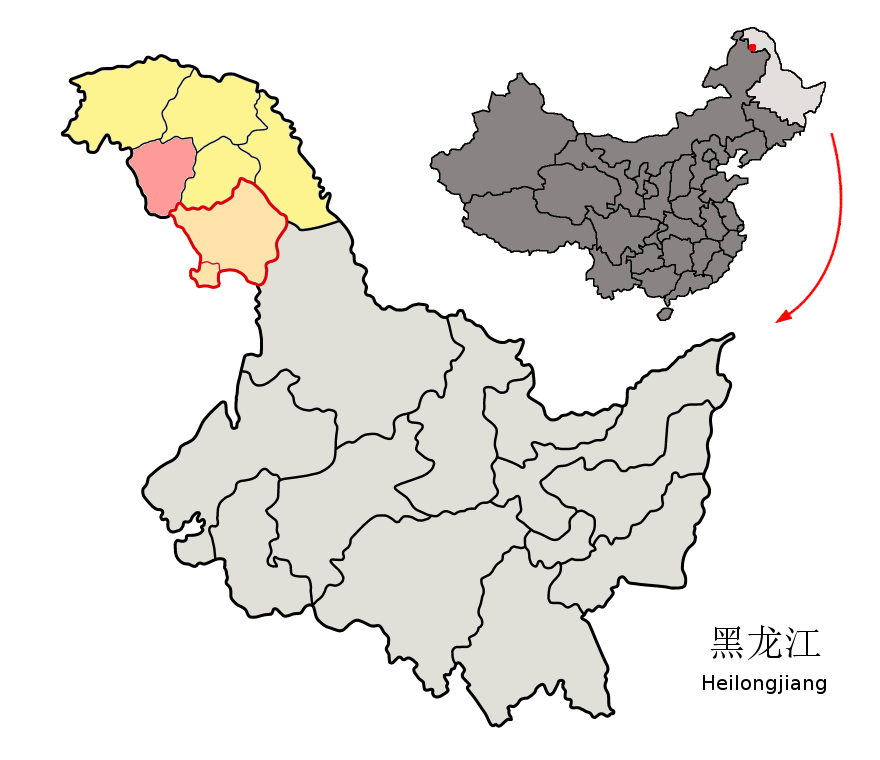
- Location of Huzhong (red) in Daxing'anling Prefecture (yellow), Heilongjiang province, and the PRC

- Location in Heilongjiang
- Coordinates: 52°02′N 123°35′E
- Country: China
- Province: Heilongjiang
- Prefecture: Daxing'anling
- District seat: Huzhong

Area
  - Total: 9,400 km^{2} (3,600 sq mi)
- Elevation: 511 m (1,677 ft)

Population (2020 census)
  - Total: 16,359
  - Density: 1.7/km^{2} (4.5/sq mi)
- Time zone: UTC+8 (China Standard)
- Website: www.huzhong.gov.cn

Huzhong District (simplified Chinese: 呼中区; traditional Chinese: 呼中區; pinyin: Hūzhōng Qū) is a de facto district of Daxing'anling Prefecture, Heilongjiang province, China. Huzhong District is not an official administrative entity; it is de jure under the jurisdiction of Huma County.

In an average year, temperatures drop to or below −40 °C (−40 °F) on more than 30 days.

== Administrative divisions ==
Huzhong District is divided into 4 towns.

4 towns

- Huzhong (呼中镇)
- Bishui (碧水镇)
- Huyuan (呼源镇)
- Huwei (宏伟镇)

== Climate ==
Climate data for Huzhong, elevation 515 m (1,690 ft), (1991–2020 normals, extremes 1981–2010)
Month	Jan	Feb	Mar	Apr	May	Jun	Jul	Aug	Sep	Oct	Nov	Dec	Year
Record high °C (°F)	−1.3 (29.7)	6.7 (44.1)	17.7 (63.9)	26.8 (80.2)	34.9 (94.8)	39.7 (103.5)	37.7 (99.9)	35.9 (96.6)	33.4 (92.1)	28.4 (83.1)	11.3 (52.3)	0.2 (32.4)	39.7 (103.5)
Mean daily maximum °C (°F)	−17.2 (1.0)	−10.0 (14.0)	−1.9 (28.6)	8.4 (47.1)	17.6 (63.7)	24.1 (75.4)	25.8 (78.4)	23.4 (74.1)	16.9 (62.4)	6.4 (43.5)	−7.8 (18.0)	−18.0 (−0.4)	5.6 (42.2)
Daily mean °C (°F)	−27.5 (−17.5)	−22.4 (−8.3)	−12.0 (10.4)	0.7 (33.3)	9.1 (48.4)	15.3 (59.5)	18.0 (64.4)	15.4 (59.7)	8.1 (46.6)	−1.6 (29.1)	−16.4 (2.5)	−26.6 (−15.9)	−3.3 (26.0)
Mean daily minimum °C (°F)	−35.1 (−31.2)	−32.4 (−26.3)	−22.6 (−8.7)	−7.3 (18.9)	0.4 (32.7)	7.4 (45.3)	12.0 (53.6)	9.9 (49.8)	1.8 (35.2)	−8.0 (17.6)	−23.2 (−9.8)	−33.3 (−27.9)	−10.9 (12.4)
Record low °C (°F)	−49.8 (−57.6)	−47.9 (−54.2)	−42.3 (−44.1)	−31.1 (−24.0)	−13.3 (8.1)	−5.8 (21.6)	0.6 (33.1)	−0.7 (30.7)	−10.8 (12.6)	−28.0 (−18.4)	−42.5 (−44.5)	−46.2 (−51.2)	−49.8 (−57.6)
Average precipitation mm (inches)	5.4 (0.21)	3.8 (0.15)	6.3 (0.25)	18.7 (0.74)	49.0 (1.93)	90.1 (3.55)	132.1 (5.20)	98.6 (3.88)	57.2 (2.25)	22.3 (0.88)	9.8 (0.39)	7.5 (0.30)	500.8 (19.73)
Average precipitation days (≥ 0.1 mm)	8.4	5.5	5.7	8.0	12.1	15.6	18.6	16.5	12.6	8.2	8.4	9.1	128.7
Average snowy days	10.6	7.6	8.2	8.8	2.2	0.2	0	0.1	1.4	8.9	11.7	11.2	70.9
Average relative humidity (%)	70	66	61	55	57	73	81	82	76	67	73	72	69
Mean monthly sunshine hours	149.0	201.4	260.9	241.0	236.7	239.3	198.3	192.2	182.5	180.0	149.8	123.5	2,354.6
Percentage possible sunshine	57	71	70	57	49	48	40	43	49	56	58	52	54
Source: China Meteorological Administration
