= Tiefeng District =

Tiefeng District 铁锋区
- District
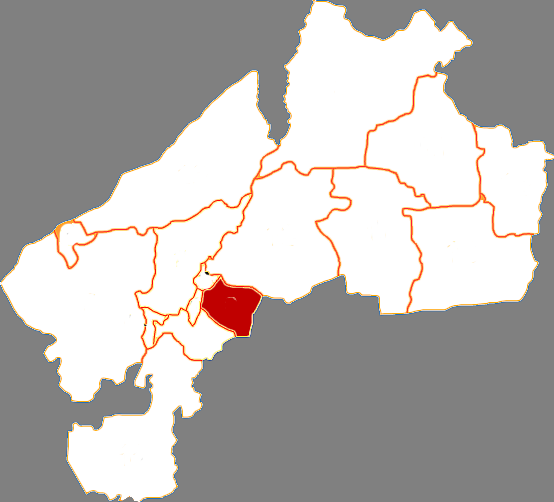
- Tiefeng in Qiqihar

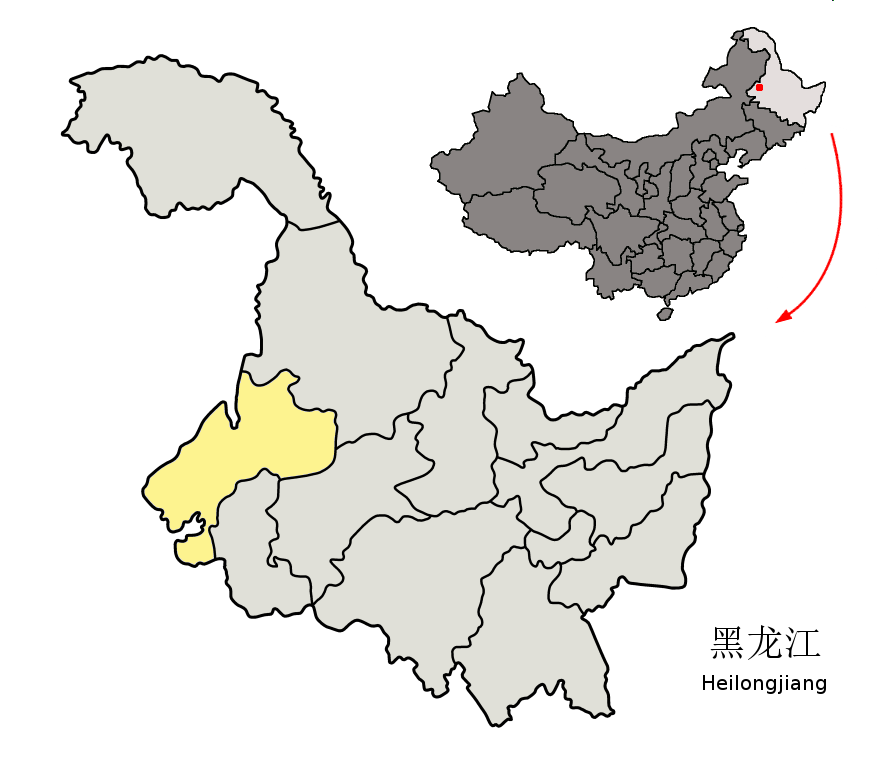
- Qiqihar in Heilongjiang
- Coordinates: 47°20′26″N 123°58′42″E
- Country: People's Republic of China
- Province: Heilongjiang
- Prefecture-level city: Qiqihar

Area
  - Total: 695 km^{2} (268 sq mi)

Population (2010)
  - Total: 331,951
  - Density: 478/km^{2} (1,240/sq mi)
- Time zone: UTC+8 (China Standard)

Tiefeng District (simplified Chinese: 铁锋区; traditional Chinese: 鐵鋒區; pinyin: Tiěfēng Qū) is an urban district of the city of Qiqihar, Heilongjiang province, China.

== Administrative divisions ==
Tiefeng District is divided into 7 subdistricts and 1 town.

7 subdistricts

- Zhanqian (站前街道), Nanpu (南浦街道), Tongdong (通东街道), Guangrong (光荣街道), Longhua (龙华街道), Beijuzhai (北局宅街道), Donghu (东湖街道)

1 town

- Zhalong (扎龙镇)
