= Nianzishan District =

Nianzishan District 碾子山区
- District
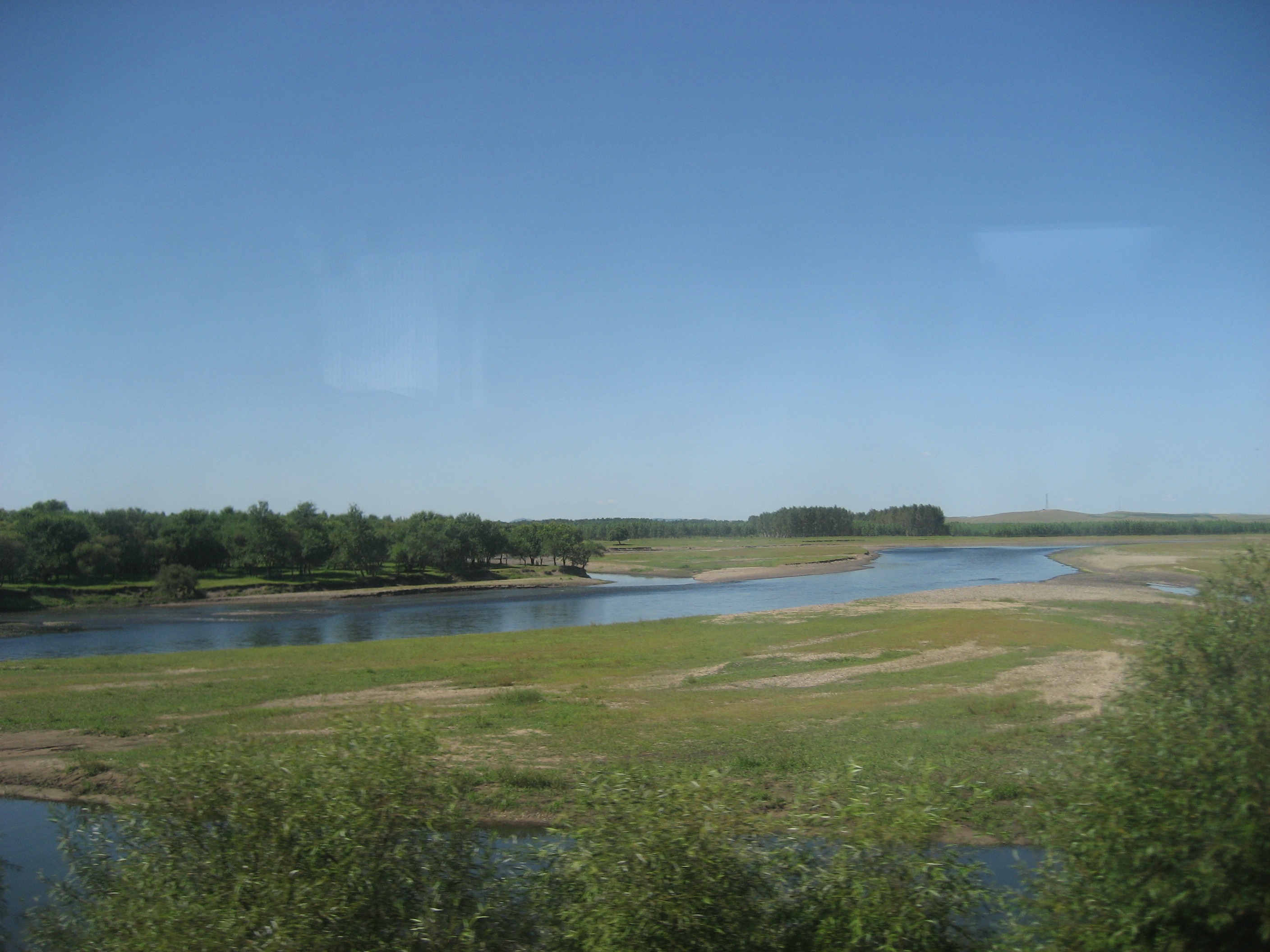

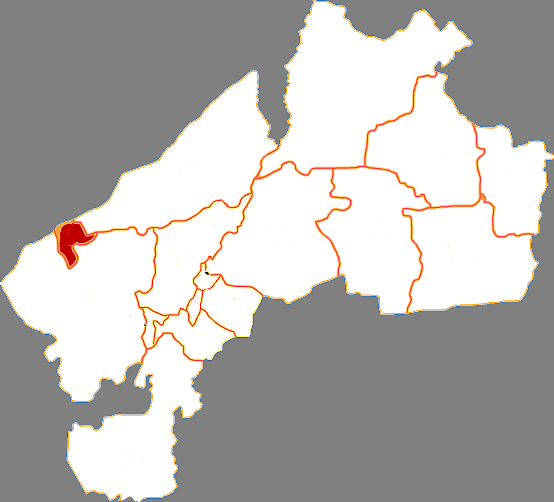
- Nianzishan in Qiqihar

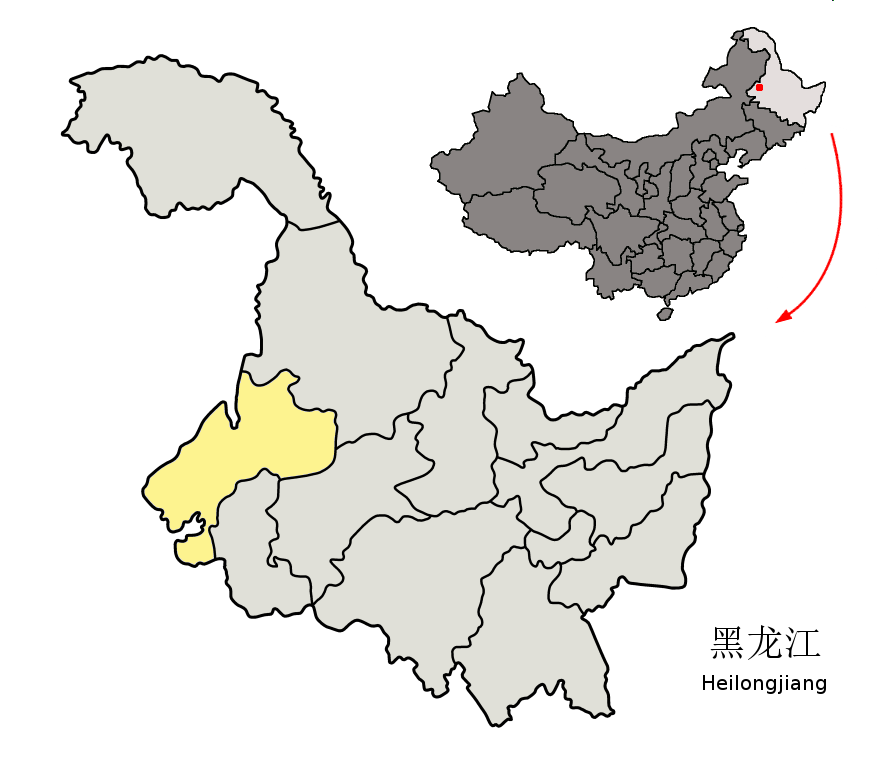
- Qiqihar in Heilongjiang
- Coordinates: 47°31′01″N 122°53′16″E
- Country: People's Republic of China
- Province: Heilongjiang
- Prefecture-level city: Qiqihar

Area
  - Total: 290 km^{2} (110 sq mi)

Population (2010)
  - Total: 72,151
  - Density: 250/km^{2} (640/sq mi)
- Time zone: UTC+8 (China Standard)

Nianzishan District (Chinese: 碾子山区; pinyin: Niǎnzishān Qū) is an outlying district of the city of Qiqihar, Heilongjiang province, China.

Nianzishan is located on the Yalu River, some 80 km (50 mi) to the west of Qiqihar's main urban area.

== Administrative divisions ==
Nianzishan District is divided into 4 subdistricts.

4 subdistricts

- Dong'an (东安街道), Fuqiang (富强街道), Yuejin (跃进街道), Fanrong (繁荣街道)
