= Dongshan District, Hegang =

Dongshan 东山区
- District
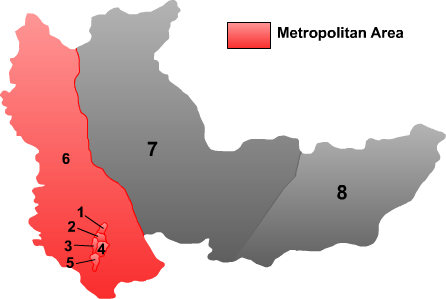
- Dongshan is the division labeled "6" on this map of Hegang City

- Location in Heilongjiang
- Coordinates: 47°41′31″N 130°19′20″E
- Country: People's Republic of China
- Province: Heilongjiang
- Prefecture-level city: Hegang

Area
  - Total: 4,575 km^{2} (1,766 sq mi)
- Elevation: 168 m (551 ft)

Population (2003)
  - Total: 175,239
  - Density: 38.30/km^{2} (99.21/sq mi)
- Time zone: UTC+8 (China Standard)

Dongshan District (simplified Chinese: 东山区; traditional Chinese: 東山區; pinyin: Dōngshān Qū; lit. 'east mountain') is a district of the city of Hegang, Heilongjiang province, People's Republic of China.

== Administrative divisions ==
Dongshan District is divided into 5 subdistricts, 1 town and 2 townships.

5 subdistricts

- Gongrencunban (工人村办街道), Xinyiban (新一办街道), Sanjieban (三街办街道), Dongshanban (东山办街道), Hexingban (鹤兴办街道)

1 town

- Xinhua (新华镇)

2 townships

- Shuyuan (蔬园乡), Dongfanghong (东方红乡)
