= Songling District =

Songling 松岭区
- County-level division
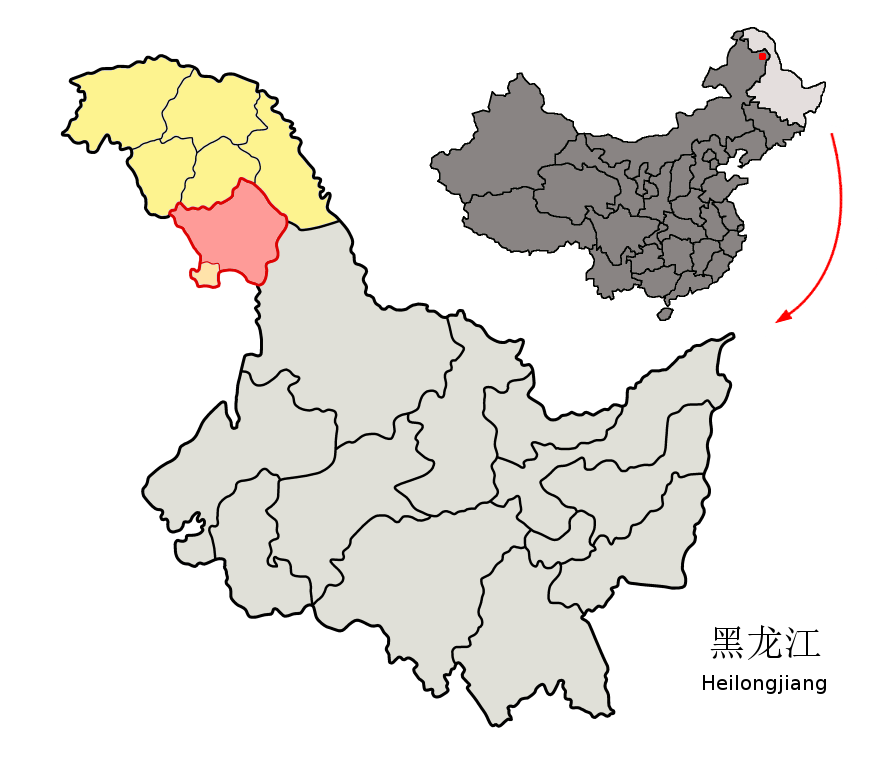
- Location of the district in Heilongjiang (outline in red) and in the PRC (pinpoint)

- Location of the district seat relative to Heilongjiang Songling (Inner Mongolia)
- Coordinates: 50°15′N 123°34′E
- Country: China
- Province: Heilongjiang
- Prefecture: Daxing'anling
- District seat: Xiaoyangqi

Area
  - Total: 7,408 km^{2} (2,860 sq mi)

Population (2020 census)
  - Total: 15,996
  - Density: 2.159/km^{2} (5.593/sq mi)
- Time zone: UTC+8 (China Standard)
- Website: www.songling.gov.cn

Songling (Chinese: 松岭区; pinyin: Sōnglǐng Qū) is a county-level division of Oroqen Autonomous Banner in Inner Mongolia, China, but it is under the de facto administration of Daxing'anling Prefecture, in Heilongjiang province.

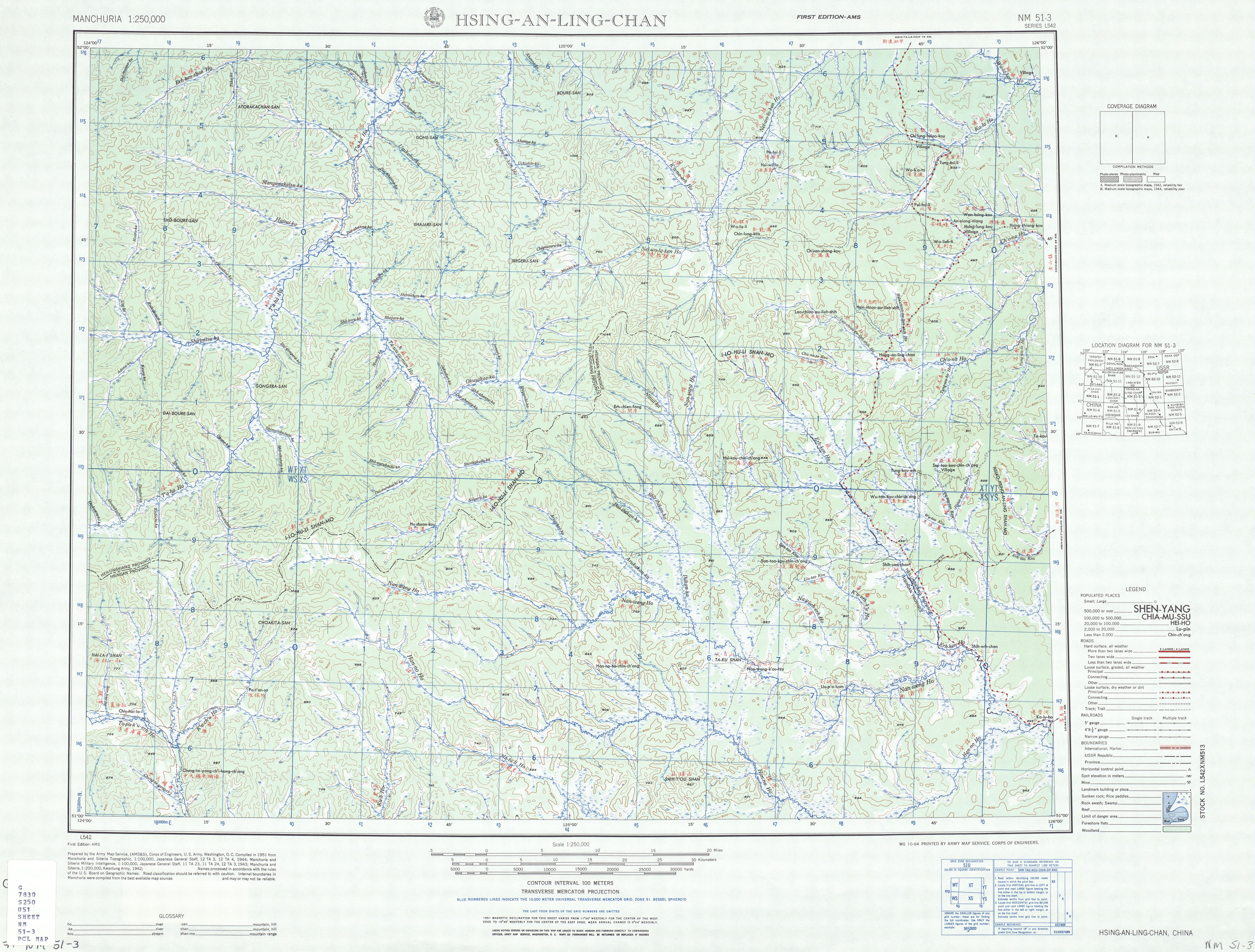
Map including part of modern-day Songling District (AMS, 1951)

== Administrative divisions ==
Songling District is divided into 3 towns.

3 towns

- Xiaoyangqi (小扬气镇)
- Jinsong (劲松镇)
- Guyuan (古源镇)
