= Lingdong, Shuangyashan =

Lingdong 岭东区
- District
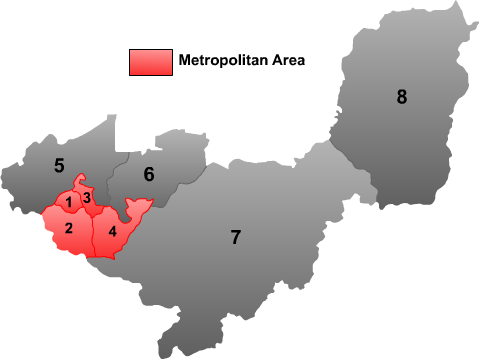
- Location of Lingdong ("2") within Shuangyashan City

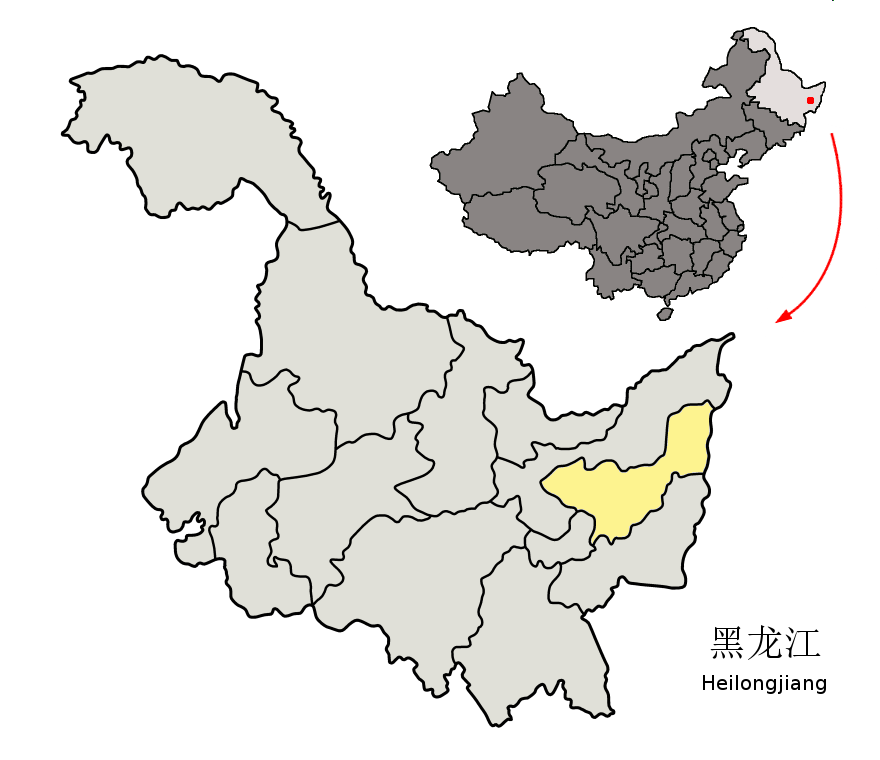
- Location of Shuangyashan City in Heilongjiang
- Coordinates: 46°35′34″N 131°09′53″E
- Country: People's Republic of China
- Province: Heilongjiang
- Prefecture-level city: Shuangyashan

Area
  - Total: 908 km^{2} (351 sq mi)
- Elevation: 175 m (574 ft)

Population (2003)
  - Total: 90,000
  - Density: 99/km^{2} (260/sq mi)
- Time zone: UTC+8 (China Standard)

Lingdong District (simplified Chinese: 岭东区; traditional Chinese: 嶺東區; pinyin: Lǐngdōng Qū) is a district of the city of Shuangyashan, Heilongjiang province, in the People's Republic of China.

== Administrative divisions ==
Lingdong District is divided into 6 subdistricts and 1 township.

6 subdistricts

- Zhongshan (中山街道), Beishan (北山街道), Nanshan (南山街道), Dongshan (东山街道), Zhongxin (中心街道), Xishan (西山街道)

1 town

- Zhangsheng (长胜乡)
