= Suibin County =

Suibin County 绥滨县
- County
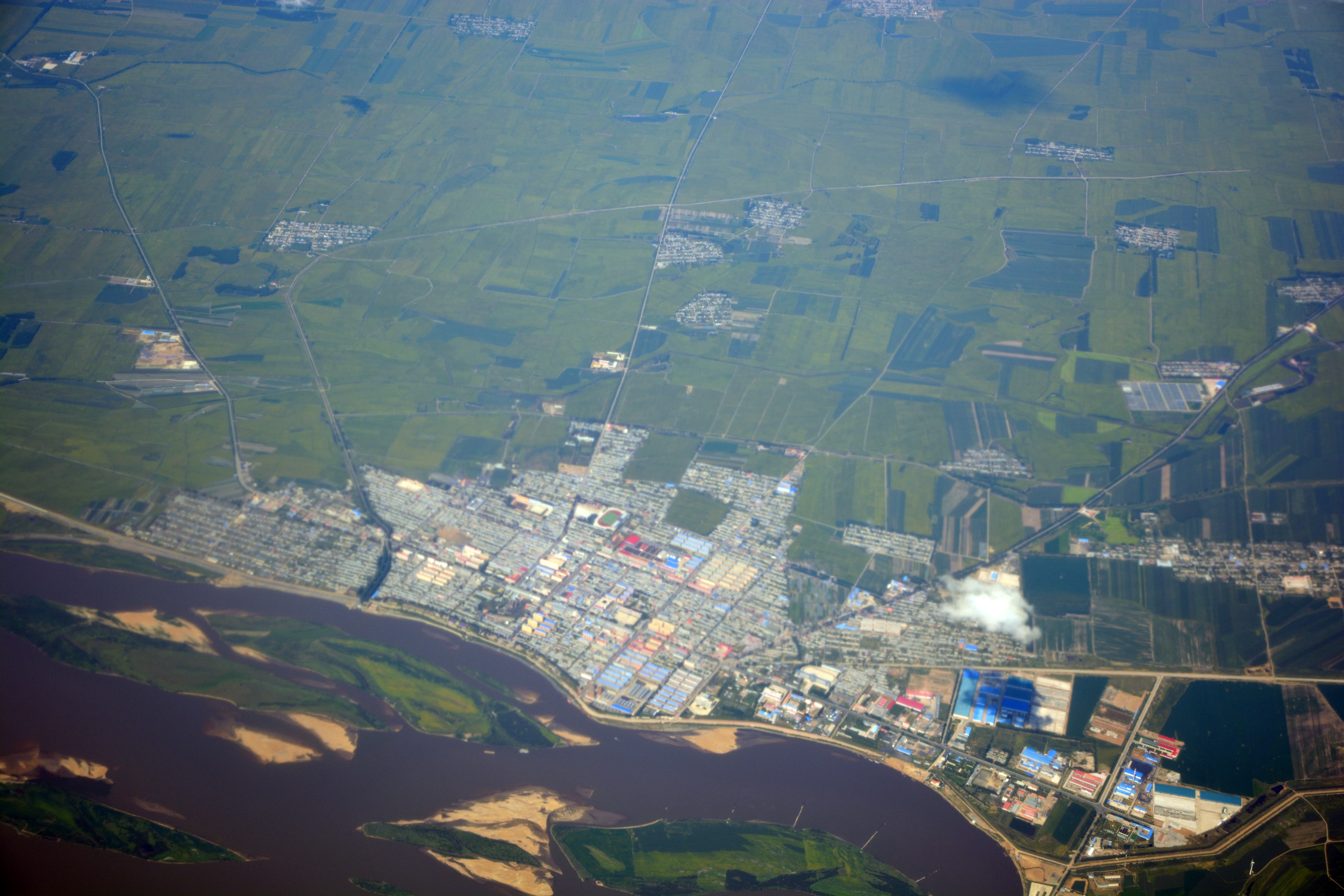
- Aerial view of Suibin County and the Sungari (Songhua River), looking north. The county seat is just north of the river

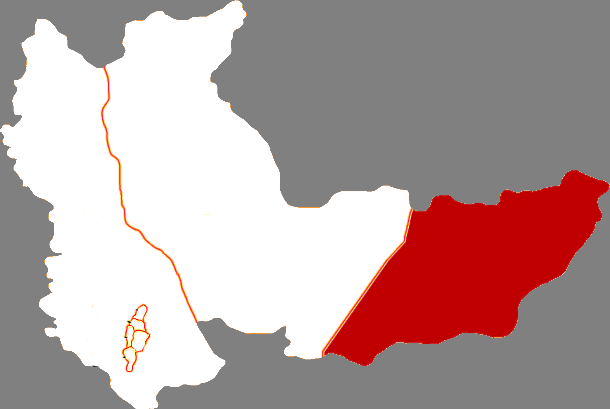
- Suibin in Hegang

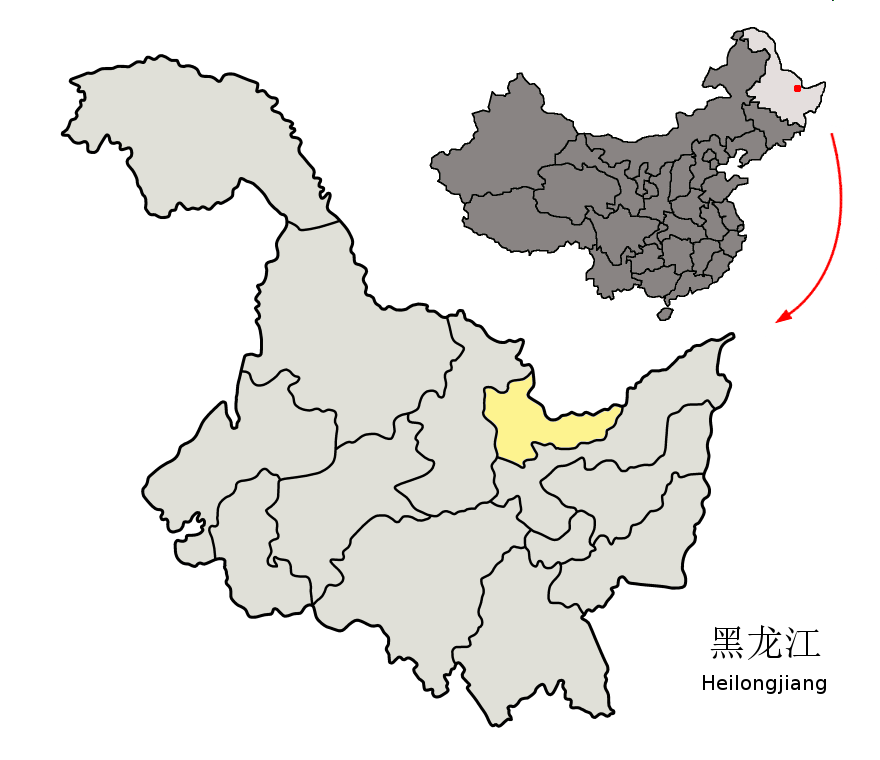
- Hegang in Heilongjiang
- Coordinates: 47°17′20″N 131°51′11″E
- Country: People's Republic of China
- Province: Heilongjiang
- Prefecture-level city: Hegang

Area
  - Total: 3,344 km^{2} (1,291 sq mi)

Population
  - Total: 174,063
  - Density: 52.05/km^{2} (134.8/sq mi)
- Time zone: UTC+8 (China Standard)

Suibin County (simplified Chinese: 绥滨县; traditional Chinese: 綏濱縣; pinyin: Suíbīn Xiàn) is a county of eastern Heilongjiang province, People's Republic of China, bordering Russia's Jewish Autonomous Oblast to the north across the Amur River. It is the easternmost county-level division of the prefecture-level city of Hegang.

It borders the Heilongjiang divisions of Tongjiang to the east, Fujin to the southeast, Huachuan County to the southwest, and Luobei County to the west.

== Administrative divisions ==
Suibin County is divided into 3 towns and 6 townships.

3 towns

- Suibin (绥滨镇), Suidong (绥东镇), Zhongren (忠仁镇)

6 townships

- Liansheng (连生乡), Beigang (北岗乡), Fuqiang (富强乡), Beishan (北山乡), Fuxing (福兴乡), Xinfu (新富乡)

== Demographics ==
The population of the district was 182,414 in 1999.

== Climate ==
Climate data for Suibin, elevation 63 m (207 ft), (1991–2020 normals, extremes 1981–2010)
Month	Jan	Feb	Mar	Apr	May	Jun	Jul	Aug	Sep	Oct	Nov	Dec	Year
Record high °C (°F)	0.1 (32.2)	6.3 (43.3)	20.1 (68.2)	30.7 (87.3)	33.6 (92.5)	37.9 (100.2)	37.6 (99.7)	36.3 (97.3)	31.0 (87.8)	26.8 (80.2)	14.5 (58.1)	3.1 (37.6)	37.9 (100.2)
Mean daily maximum °C (°F)	−13.7 (7.3)	−8.6 (16.5)	0.6 (33.1)	11.6 (52.9)	19.8 (67.6)	24.7 (76.5)	27.1 (80.8)	25.7 (78.3)	20.6 (69.1)	11.2 (52.2)	−2.0 (28.4)	−12.5 (9.5)	8.7 (47.7)
Daily mean °C (°F)	−18.8 (−1.8)	−14.5 (5.9)	−4.8 (23.4)	5.8 (42.4)	14.2 (57.6)	19.7 (67.5)	22.6 (72.7)	21.1 (70.0)	15.0 (59.0)	5.8 (42.4)	−6.5 (20.3)	−17.0 (1.4)	3.6 (38.4)
Mean daily minimum °C (°F)	−23.1 (−9.6)	−20.0 (−4.0)	−10.3 (13.5)	0.4 (32.7)	8.7 (47.7)	15.1 (59.2)	18.6 (65.5)	17.0 (62.6)	10.1 (50.2)	0.9 (33.6)	−10.6 (12.9)	−20.9 (−5.6)	−1.2 (29.9)
Record low °C (°F)	−37.0 (−34.6)	−34.7 (−30.5)	−26.9 (−16.4)	−13.9 (7.0)	−3.1 (26.4)	5.9 (42.6)	10.0 (50.0)	7.5 (45.5)	−1.3 (29.7)	−12.8 (9.0)	−27.2 (−17.0)	−31.5 (−24.7)	−37.0 (−34.6)
Average precipitation mm (inches)	5.1 (0.20)	5.3 (0.21)	12.1 (0.48)	28.6 (1.13)	62.1 (2.44)	83.8 (3.30)	126.2 (4.97)	105.1 (4.14)	68.7 (2.70)	30.1 (1.19)	14.9 (0.59)	9.1 (0.36)	551.1 (21.71)
Average precipitation days (≥ 0.1 mm)	5.9	4.6	6.3	8.7	12.5	13.1	13.6	12.9	10.8	7.7	6.1	7.2	109.4
Average snowy days	9.2	7.1	8.9	4.8	0.1	0	0	0	0.1	2.7	8.6	10.9	52.4
Average relative humidity (%)	72	68	63	60	63	72	80	82	75	65	68	73	70
Mean monthly sunshine hours	194.4	218.6	263.2	248.7	262.7	250.9	243.6	245.7	233.0	210.5	173.3	167.4	2,712
Percentage possible sunshine	70	75	71	61	56	53	51	56	63	63	63	64	62
Source: China Meteorological Administration
