= Tangyuan County =

Tangyuan County 汤原县
- County
- Fengming Park county sculpture street view Daliangzihe National Forest Park Yuanhai Temple Tangwang River Bus terminal

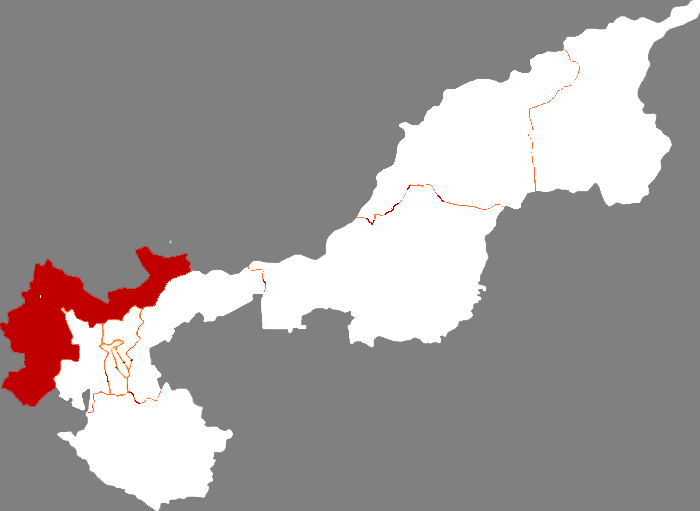
- Tangyuan in Jiamusi

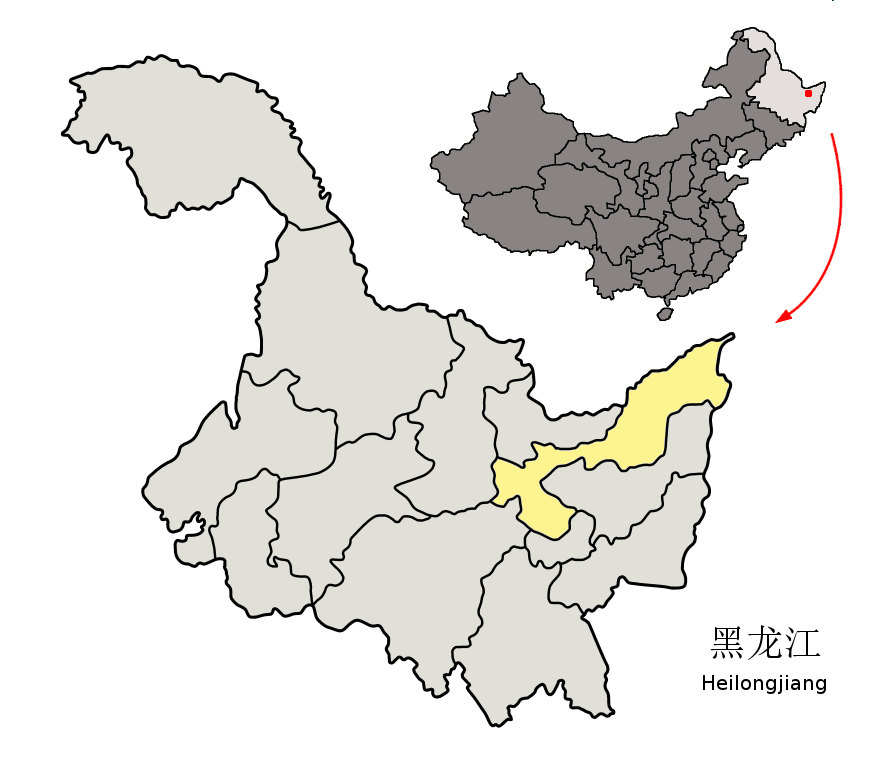
- Jiamusi in Heilongjiang
- Coordinates: 46°43′51″N 129°54′18″E
- Country: People's Republic of China
- Province: Heilongjiang
- Prefecture-level city: Jiamusi

Area
  - Total: 3,230 km^{2} (1,250 sq mi)

Population (2010)
  - Total: 255,211
  - Density: 79.0/km^{2} (205/sq mi)
- Time zone: UTC+8 (China Standard)

Tangyuan County (simplified Chinese: 汤原县; traditional Chinese: 湯原縣; pinyin: Tāngyuán Xiàn) is a county in the east of Heilongjiang province, China. It is the westernmost county-level division of the prefecture-level city of Jiamusi.

== Administrative divisions ==
Tangyuan County is divided into 4 towns and 6 townships.

4 towns

- Xianglan (香兰镇), Heli (鹤立镇), Zhulian (竹帘镇), Tangyuan (汤原镇)

6 townships

- Tangwang (汤旺乡), Shengli (胜利乡), Jixiang (吉祥乡), Zhenxing (振兴乡), Taipingchuan (太平川乡), Yongfa (永发乡)

== Demographics ==
The population of the district was 266,698 in 1999.

== Climate ==
Climate data for Tangyuan, elevation 95 m (312 ft), (1991–2020 normals, extremes 1981–present)
Month	Jan	Feb	Mar	Apr	May	Jun	Jul	Aug	Sep	Oct	Nov	Dec	Year
Record high °C (°F)	2.3 (36.1)	8.6 (47.5)	19.7 (67.5)	29.6 (85.3)	33.7 (92.7)	37.8 (100.0)	38.0 (100.4)	34.5 (94.1)	31.0 (87.8)	25.8 (78.4)	15.5 (59.9)	5.1 (41.2)	38.0 (100.4)
Mean daily maximum °C (°F)	−12.5 (9.5)	−6.6 (20.1)	2.1 (35.8)	12.6 (54.7)	20.4 (68.7)	25.0 (77.0)	27.3 (81.1)	25.6 (78.1)	20.8 (69.4)	11.6 (52.9)	−1.0 (30.2)	−11.1 (12.0)	9.5 (49.1)
Daily mean °C (°F)	−18.5 (−1.3)	−13.6 (7.5)	−4.2 (24.4)	6.1 (43.0)	14.0 (57.2)	19.4 (66.9)	22.3 (72.1)	20.4 (68.7)	14.2 (57.6)	5.4 (41.7)	−6.2 (20.8)	−16.3 (2.7)	3.6 (38.4)
Mean daily minimum °C (°F)	−23.6 (−10.5)	−20.0 (−4.0)	−10.3 (13.5)	0.0 (32.0)	7.8 (46.0)	14.5 (58.1)	17.9 (64.2)	16.0 (60.8)	8.6 (47.5)	0.1 (32.2)	−10.8 (12.6)	−20.9 (−5.6)	−1.7 (28.9)
Record low °C (°F)	−38.8 (−37.8)	−33.8 (−28.8)	−28.9 (−20.0)	−12.1 (10.2)	−5.5 (22.1)	5.3 (41.5)	10.5 (50.9)	7.5 (45.5)	−2.5 (27.5)	−12.9 (8.8)	−29.1 (−20.4)	−35.2 (−31.4)	−38.8 (−37.8)
Average precipitation mm (inches)	3.9 (0.15)	4.0 (0.16)	13.6 (0.54)	26.8 (1.06)	62.4 (2.46)	98.6 (3.88)	133.2 (5.24)	134.6 (5.30)	66.9 (2.63)	27.6 (1.09)	12.5 (0.49)	8.2 (0.32)	592.3 (23.32)
Average precipitation days (≥ 0.1 mm)	4.3	3.6	6.5	7.7	12.0	14.0	14.6	13.5	10.5	7.1	5.2	5.9	104.9
Average snowy days	8.0	5.9	8.7	3.7	0.1	0	0	0	0	2.1	7.9	9.4	45.8
Average relative humidity (%)	70	65	59	57	61	74	82	84	77	66	65	71	69
Mean monthly sunshine hours	178.8	201.3	235.6	217.7	228.0	211.0	199.6	202.3	215.4	195.7	166.8	157.4	2,409.6
Percentage possible sunshine	64	69	64	53	49	45	42	47	58	59	60	59	56
Source: China Meteorological AdministrationAll-time May Record
