= Xiangyang District, Jiamusi =

Coordinates: 46°48′28″N 130°21′53″E

Xiangyang District 向阳区
- District
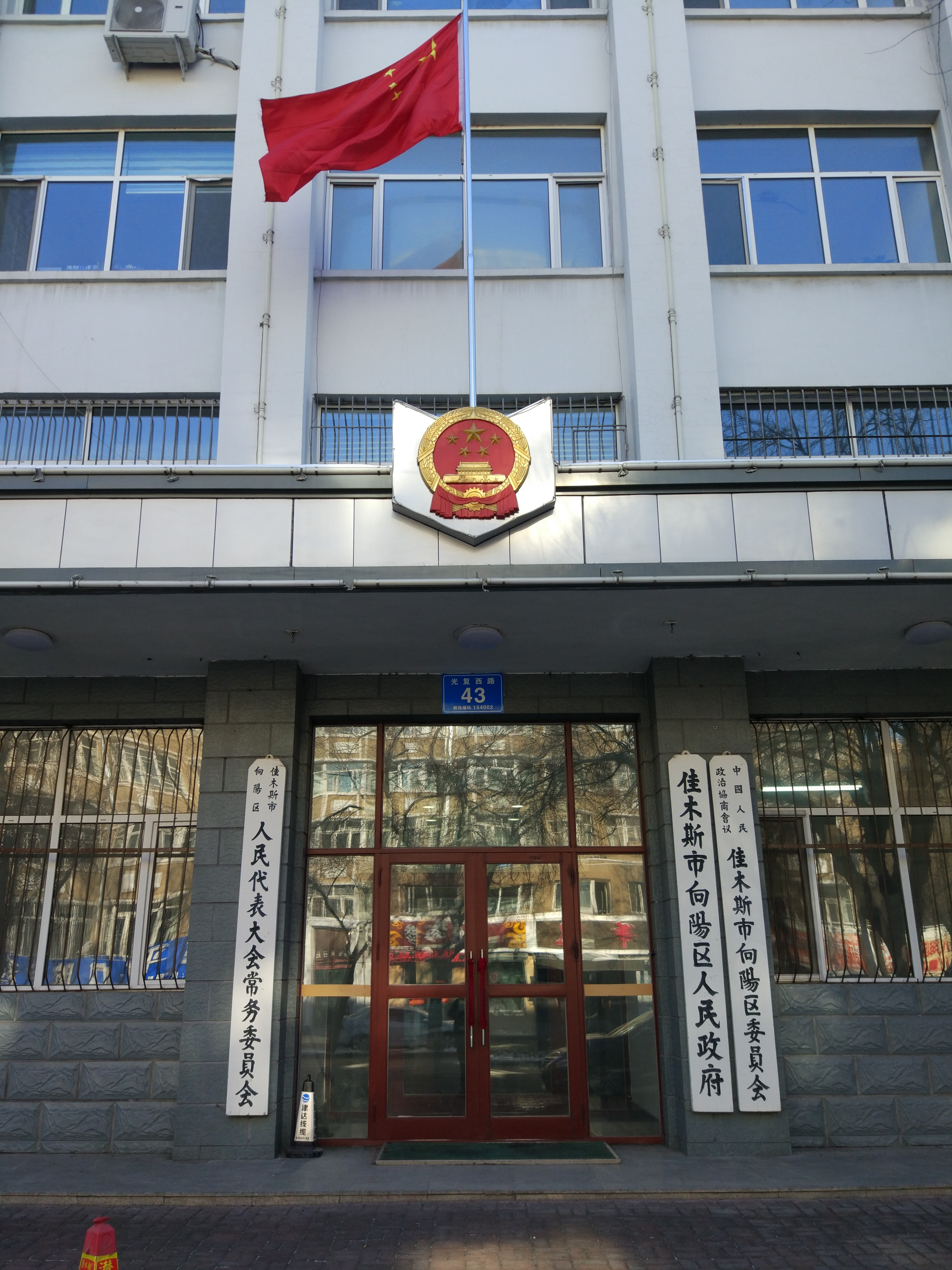

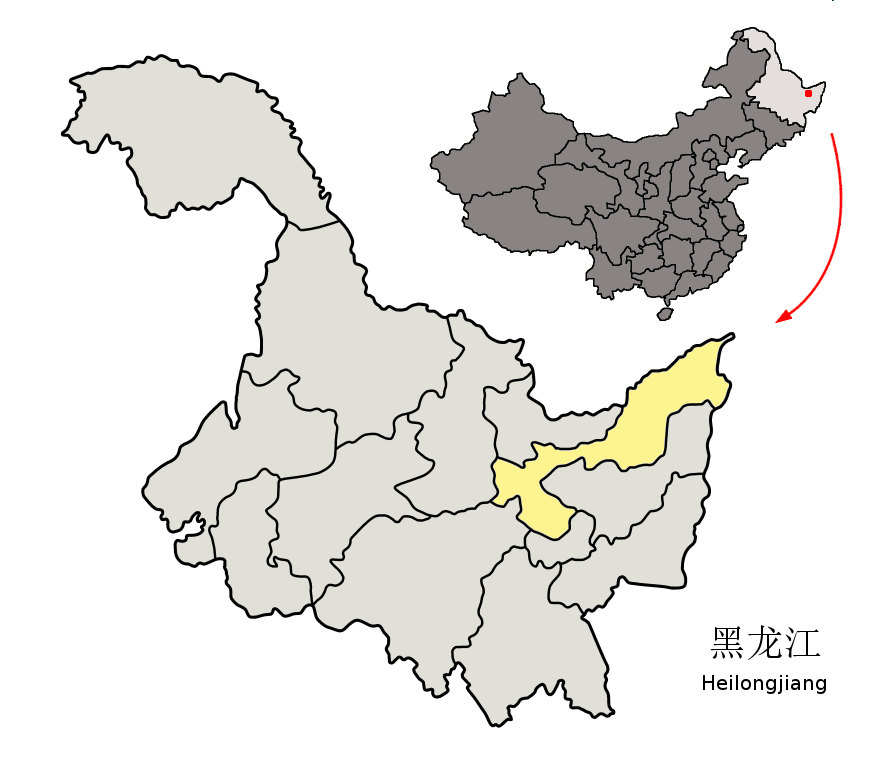
- Jiamusi in Heilongjiang
- Country: People's Republic of China
- Province: Heilongjiang
- Prefecture-level city: Jiamusi
- District seat: Guangfu Road No.1081 (光复路1081号)

Area
  - Total: 38 km^{2} (15 sq mi)

Population (2012)
  - Total: 234,000
  - Density: 6,200/km^{2} (16,000/sq mi)
- Time zone: UTC+8 (China Standard)
- Postal code: 10002X
- Website: xyq.gov.cn

Xiangyang District (simplified Chinese: 向阳区; traditional Chinese: 向陽區; pinyin: Xiàngyáng Qū) is an administrative subdivision of the city of Jiamusi, Heilongjiang province, China, with 233,855 inhabitants.

== Administrative divisions ==
Xiangyang District is divided into 6 subdistricts.

6 subdistricts

- Xilin (西林街道), Baowei (保卫街道), Qiaonan (桥南街道), Xinangang (西南岗街道), Jianshe (建设街道), Chang'an (长安街道)
