= Sifangtai, Shuangyashan =

Coordinates: 46°35′43″N 131°20′32″E

Sifangtai District 四方台区
- District
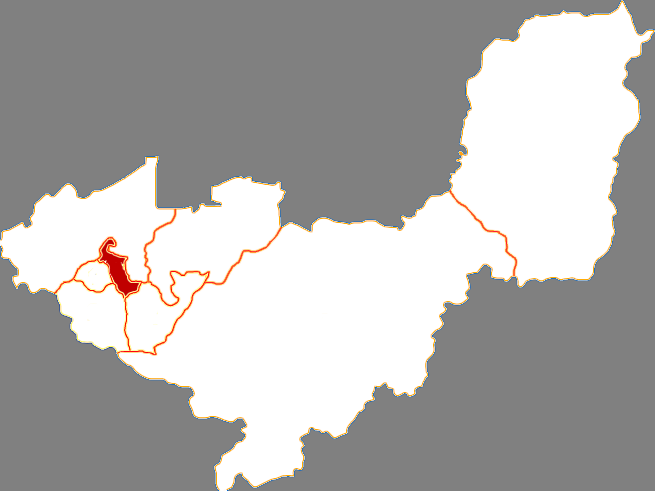
- Sifangtai in Shuangyashan

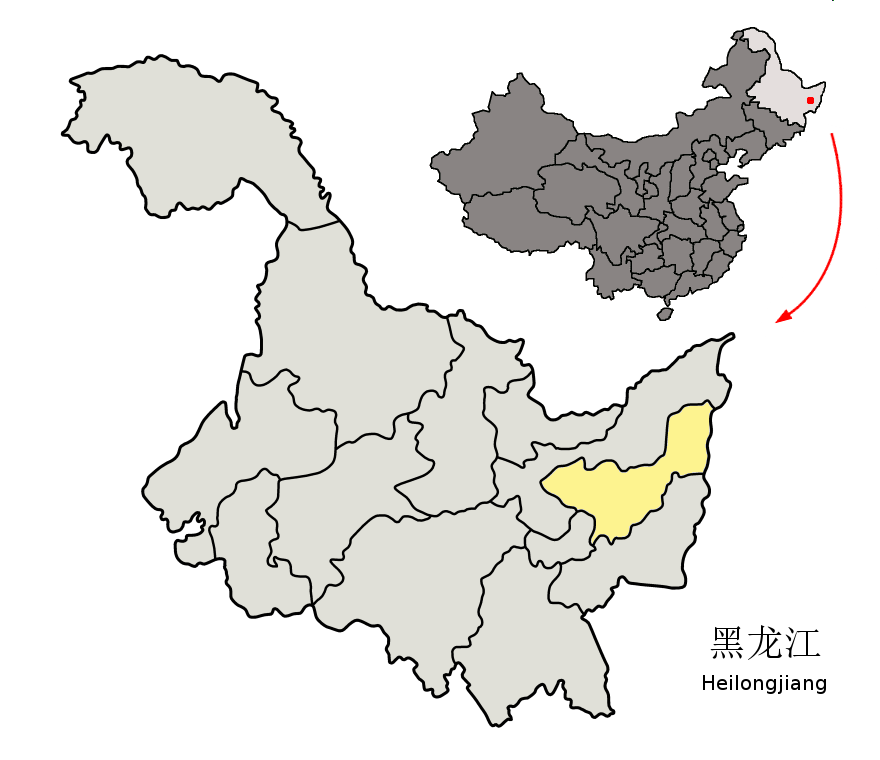
- Shuangyashan in Harbin
- Country: People's Republic of China
- Province: Heilongjiang
- Prefecture-level city: Shuangyashan
- District seat: Zhenxing Zhong Road No.11 (振兴中路11号)

Area
  - Total: 194 km^{2} (75 sq mi)

Population (2010)
  - Total: 73,000
  - Density: 380/km^{2} (970/sq mi)
- Time zone: UTC+8 (China Standard)
- Postal code: 10002X
- Website: syssft.gov.cn

Sifangtai District (Chinese: 四方台区; pinyin: Sìfāngtái Qū) is a district of the city of Shuangyashan, Heilongjiang province, China.

== Administrative divisions ==
Sifangtai District is divided into 4 subdistricts and 1 township.

4 subdistricts

- Zhenxingzhonglu (振兴中路街道), Zhenxingdonglu (振兴东路街道), Jixian (集贤街道), Dongrong (东荣街道)

1 town

- Taibao (太保镇)
