= Xing'an District =

Xing'an District 兴安区
- District
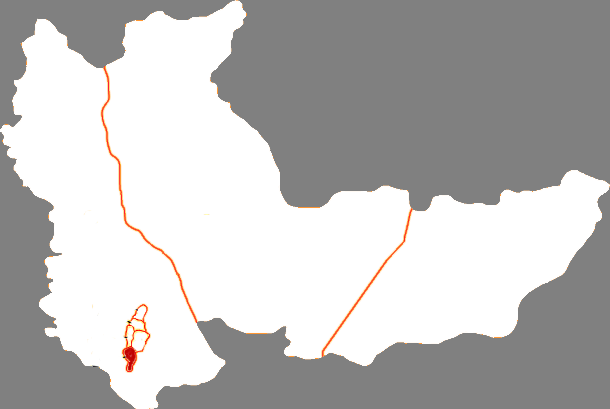
- Xing'an in Hegang

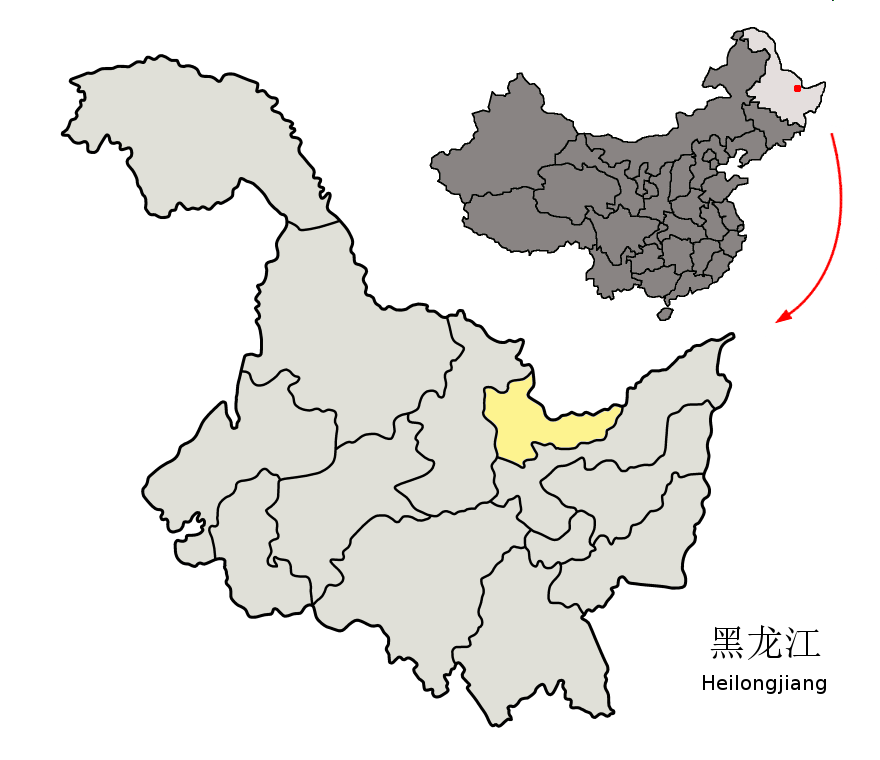
- Hegang in Heilongjiang
- Coordinates: 47°15′11″N 130°14′24″E
- Country: People's Republic of China
- Province: Heilongjiang
- Prefecture-level city: Hegang

Area
  - Total: 27 km^{2} (10 sq mi)

Population
  - Total: 74,396
  - Density: 2,800/km^{2} (7,100/sq mi)
- Time zone: UTC+8 (China Standard)

Xing'an District (simplified Chinese: 兴安区; traditional Chinese: 興安區; pinyin: Xīng'ān Qū) is an urban district of the city of Hegang, Heilongjiang province, China.

== Administrative divisions ==
Xing'an District is divided into 6 subdistricts and 1 town.

6 subdistricts

- Xing'anlu (兴安路街道), Xingjianlu (兴建路街道), Xingzhanglu (兴长路街道), Jundelu (峻德路街道), Hedonglu (河东路街道), Guangyu (光宇街道)

1 town

- Hongqi (红旗镇)
