= Baoshan, Shuangyashan =

Baoshan 宝山区
- District
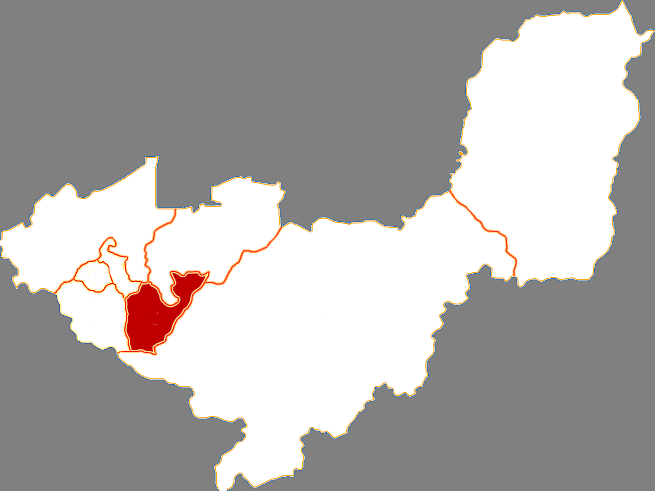

- Location in Heilongjiang
- Coordinates: 46°34′38″N 131°24′06″E
- Country: People's Republic of China
- Province: Heilongjiang
- Prefecture-level city: Shuangyashan
- Township-level divisions: 7 subdistricts 1 town
- District seat: Hongqi Subdistrict (红旗街道)

Area
  - Total: 572 km^{2} (221 sq mi)
- Elevation: 183 m (600 ft)

Population (2003)
  - Total: 130,000
  - Density: 230/km^{2} (590/sq mi)
- Time zone: UTC+8 (China Standard)
- Postal code: 155131
- Area code: 0469

Baoshan District (simplified Chinese: 宝山区; traditional Chinese: 寶山區; pinyin: Bǎoshān Qū) is a district of the city of Shuangyashan, Heilongjiang, People's Republic of China.

== Administrative divisions ==
There are seven subdistricts and one town in the district:

Subdistricts:

- Hongqi Subdistrict (红旗街道), Yuejin Subdistrict (跃进街道), Qixing Subdistrict (七星街道), Shuangyang Subdistrict (双阳街道), Xin'an Subdistrict (新安街道), East Baowei Subdistrict (东保卫街道), Dianchang Subdistrict (电厂街道)

The only town is Qixing (七星镇)
