= Zhaozhou, Heilongjiang =

Zhaozhou 肇州镇
- Town
- Location in Heilongjiang Zhaozhou (China)
- Coordinates: 45°41′59″N 125°16′07″E
- Country: People's Republic of China
- Province: Heilongjiang
- Prefecture-level city: Daqing
- County: Zhaozhou
- Elevation: 150 m (490 ft)
- Time zone: UTC+8 (China Standard)
- Postal code: 166400

Zhaozhou (Chinese: 肇州; pinyin: Zhàozhōu) is a town in and the seat of Zhaozhou County in southwestern Heilongjiang province, China. As of 2011, it has 11 residential communities (社区) and 7 villages under its administration. It is serviced by China National Highway 203.
