= Xinxing District, Qitaihe =

Xinxing 新兴区
- District
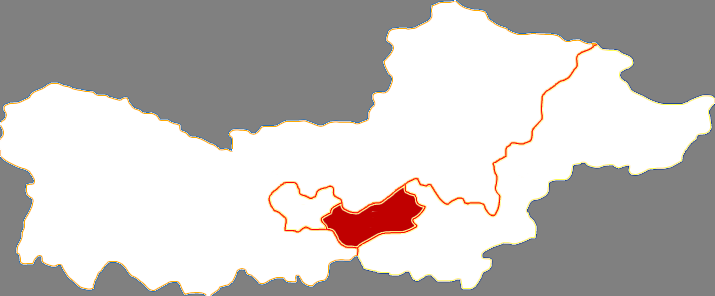
- Location in Qitaihe

- Location in Heilongjiang
- Coordinates: 45°48′57″N 130°55′55″E
- Country: People's Republic of China
- Province: Heilongjiang
- Prefecture-level city: Qitaihe

Area
  - Total: 2,003 km^{2} (773 sq mi)
- Elevation: 194 m (636 ft)

Population (2010)
  - Total: 236,768
  - Density: 118.2/km^{2} (306.2/sq mi)
- Time zone: UTC+8 (China Standard)
- Postal code: 154604

Xinxing District (simplified Chinese: 新兴区; traditional Chinese: 新興區; pinyin: Xīnxīng Qū) is a district of the city of Qitaihe, Heilongjiang, People's Republic of China.

== Administrative divisions ==
There are 17 subdistricts, 1 town and 1 township in the district.

Subdistricts:

- Xing'an Shequgonggongfuwuzhan (兴安社区公共服务站街道), Xingle Shequgonggongfuwuzhan (兴乐社区公共服务站街道), Xingfu Shequgonggongfuwuzhan (兴富社区公共服务站街道), Xingxiu Shequgonggongfuwuzhan (兴秀社区公共服务站街道), Xingping Shequgonggongfuwuzhan (兴平社区公共服务站街道), Xinghe Shequgonggongfuwuzhan (兴和社区公共服务站街道), Xingcheng Shequgonggongfuwuzhan (兴城社区公共服务站街道), Xingsheng Shequgonggongfuwuzhan (兴盛社区公共服务站街道), Beishan Shequgonggongfuwuzhan (北山社区公共服务站街道), Xinyuan Shequgonggongfuwuzhan (欣源社区公共服务站街道), Dongmei Shequgonggongfuwuzhan (冬梅社区公共服务站街道), Fengye Shequgonggongfuwuzhan (枫叶社区公共服务站街道), Anju Shequgonggongfuwuzhan (安居社区公共服务站街道), Henan Shequgonggongfuwuzhan (河南社区公共服务站街道), Xinli Shequgonggongfuwuzhan (新立社区公共服务站街道), Xincheng Shequgonggongfuwuzhan (新城社区公共服务站街道) and Gangyaogou Shequgonggongfuwuzhan(缸窑沟社区公共服务站街道)

The only town is Hongqi (红旗镇) and the only township is Zhangxing (长兴乡).
