= Youyi County =

Youyi County 友谊县
- County
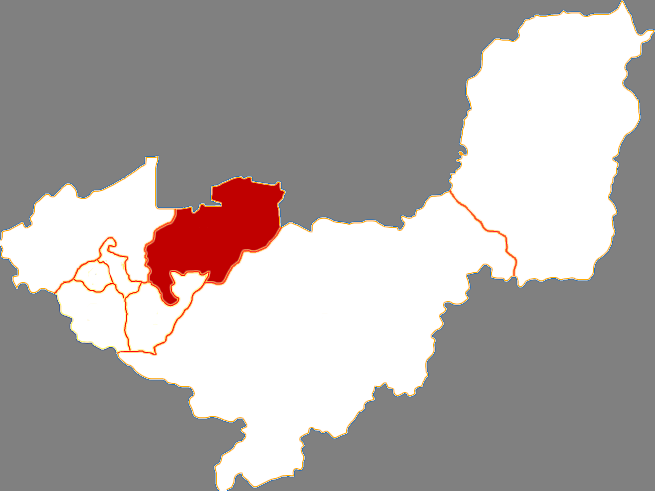
- Youyi in Shuangyashan

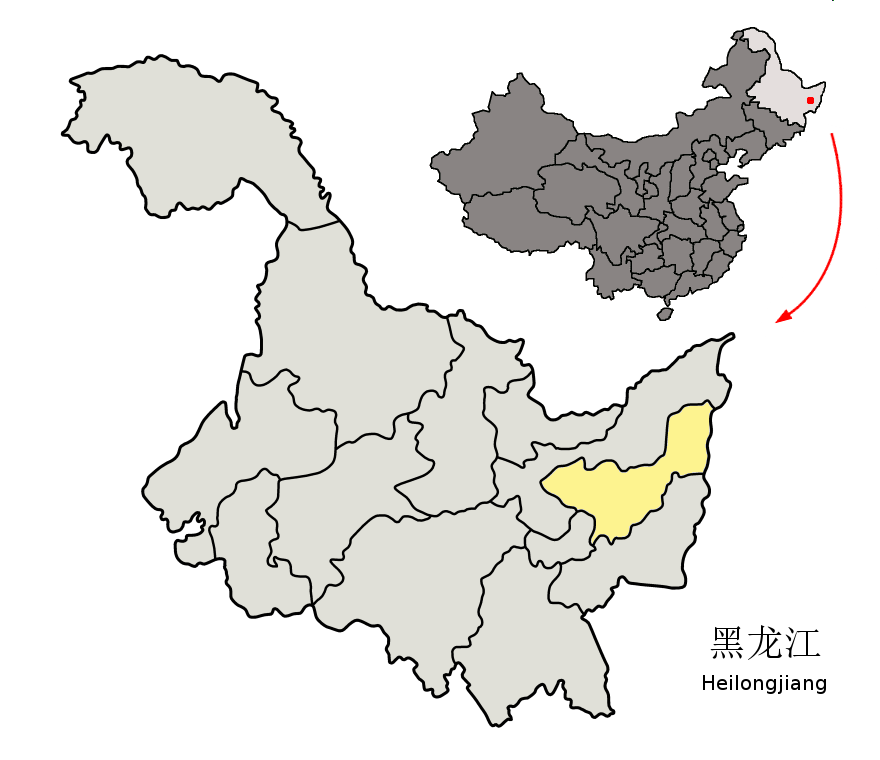
- Shuangyashan in Heilongjiang
- Coordinates: 46°46′01″N 131°48′29″E
- Country: People's Republic of China
- Province: Heilongjiang
- Prefecture-level city: Shuangyashan

Area
  - Total: 1,800 km^{2} (690 sq mi)

Population (2003)
  - Total: 120,000
  - Density: 67/km^{2} (170/sq mi)
- Time zone: UTC+8 (China Standard)

Pronunciation of "yǒuyì" (友谊) in Putonghua (Mandarin) by a male native of Beijing

Youyi County (simplified Chinese: 友谊县; traditional Chinese: 友誼縣; pinyin: Yǒuyì Xiàn; lit. 'friendship') is a county of eastern Heilongjiang province, People's Republic of China. It is under the jurisdiction of the prefecture-level city of Shuangyashan.

== Administrative divisions ==
Youyi County is divided into 4 towns, 6 townships and 1 ethnic township.

4 towns

- Youyi (友谊镇), Xinglong (兴隆镇), Longshan (龙山镇), Fenggang (凤岗镇)

6 townships

- Xingsheng (兴盛乡), Dongjian (东建乡), Qingfeng (庆丰乡), Jianshe (建设乡), Youlin (友邻乡), Xinzhen (新镇乡)

1 ethnic township

- Chengfu Korean and Manchu (红兴隆管理局局直)

== Demographics ==
The population of the district was 125,464 in 1999.
