= Dongfeng District =

Dongfeng 东风区
- District
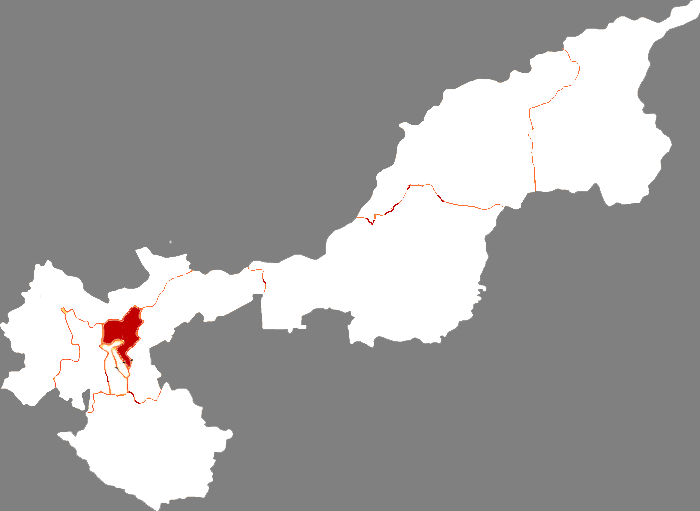
- Location in Jiamusi

- Location in Heilongjiang
- Coordinates: 46°49′21″N 130°24′13″E
- Country: People's Republic of China
- Province: Heilongjiang
- Prefecture-level city: Jiamusi

Area
  - Total: 53 km^{2} (20 sq mi)
- Elevation: 80 m (260 ft)

Population (2003)
  - Total: 100,000
  - Density: 1,900/km^{2} (4,900/sq mi)
- Time zone: UTC+8 (China Standard)

Dongfeng District (simplified Chinese: 东风区; traditional Chinese: 東風區; pinyin: Dōngfēng Qū; lit. 'east wind') is a district of the city of Jiamusi, Heilongjiang province, People's Republic of China.

== Administrative divisions ==
Dongfeng District is divided into 5 subdistricts, 1 town and 1 township.

5 subdistricts

- Xiaoyun (晓云街道), Jiadong (佳东街道), Zaozhi (造纸街道), Jianan (佳南街道), Jianguo (建国街道),

1 town

- Jianguo (建国镇)

1 township

- Songjiang (松江乡)
