= Dong'an District, Mudanjiang =

Dong'an District 东安区
- District
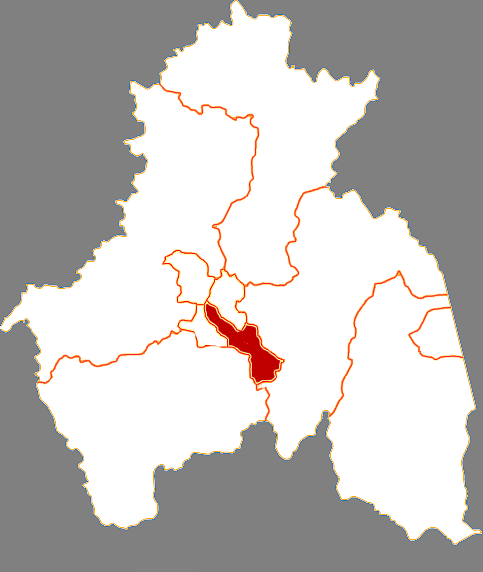
- Location of Dongan District in Mudanjiang

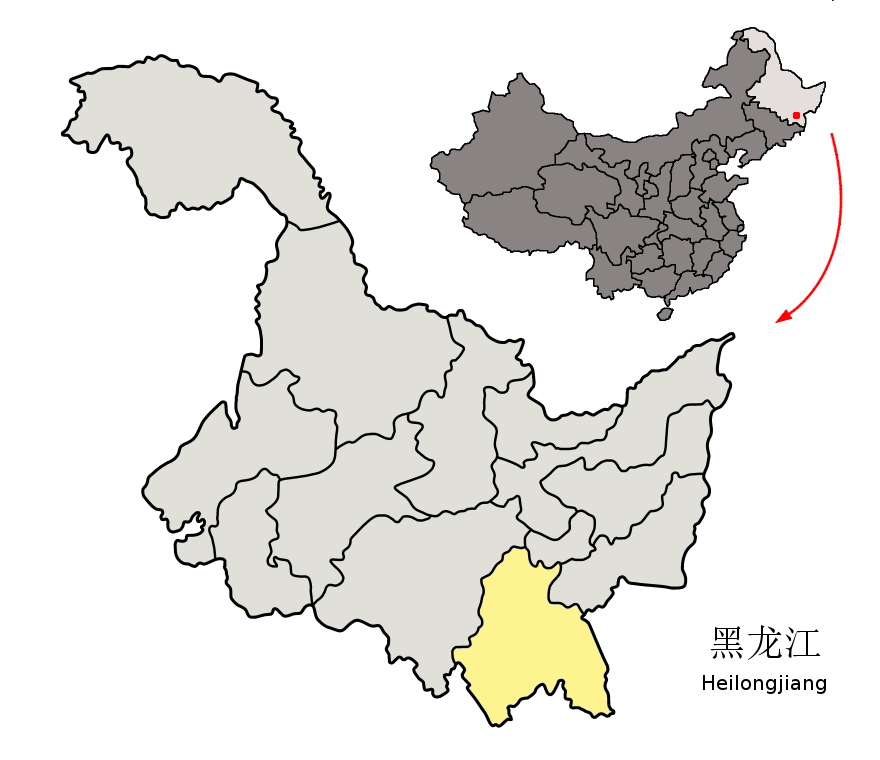
- Mudanjiang in Heilongjiang
- Coordinates: 44°34′53″N 129°37′36″E
- Country: People's Republic of China
- Province: Heilongjiang
- Prefecture-level city: Mudanjiang
- Township-level divisions: 5 subdistricts
- District seat: No.123, East Chang'an Street (东长安街123号)

Area
  - Total: 294.2 km^{2} (113.6 sq mi)
- Elevation: 235 m (771 ft)

Population (2017)
  - Total: 220,000
  - Density: 750/km^{2} (1,900/sq mi)
- Time zone: UTC+8 (China Standard)
- Postal code: 157000
- Website: www.donganqu.gov.cn

Dong'an District (simplified Chinese: 东安区; traditional Chinese: 東安區; pinyin: Dōng'ān Qū; lit. 'east peace') is a district of the city of Mudanjiang, Heilongjiang province, People's Republic of China.

== Administrative divisions ==
There are five subdistricts and one town in the district:

- Qixing Subdistrict (七星街道), Xin'an Subdistrict (新安街道), Chang'an Subdistrict (长安街道), Wuxing Subdistrict (五星街道), Dongxing Subdistrict (东兴街道), Xinglong Town (兴隆镇)
