= Yimei District =

Yimei 伊美区
- District
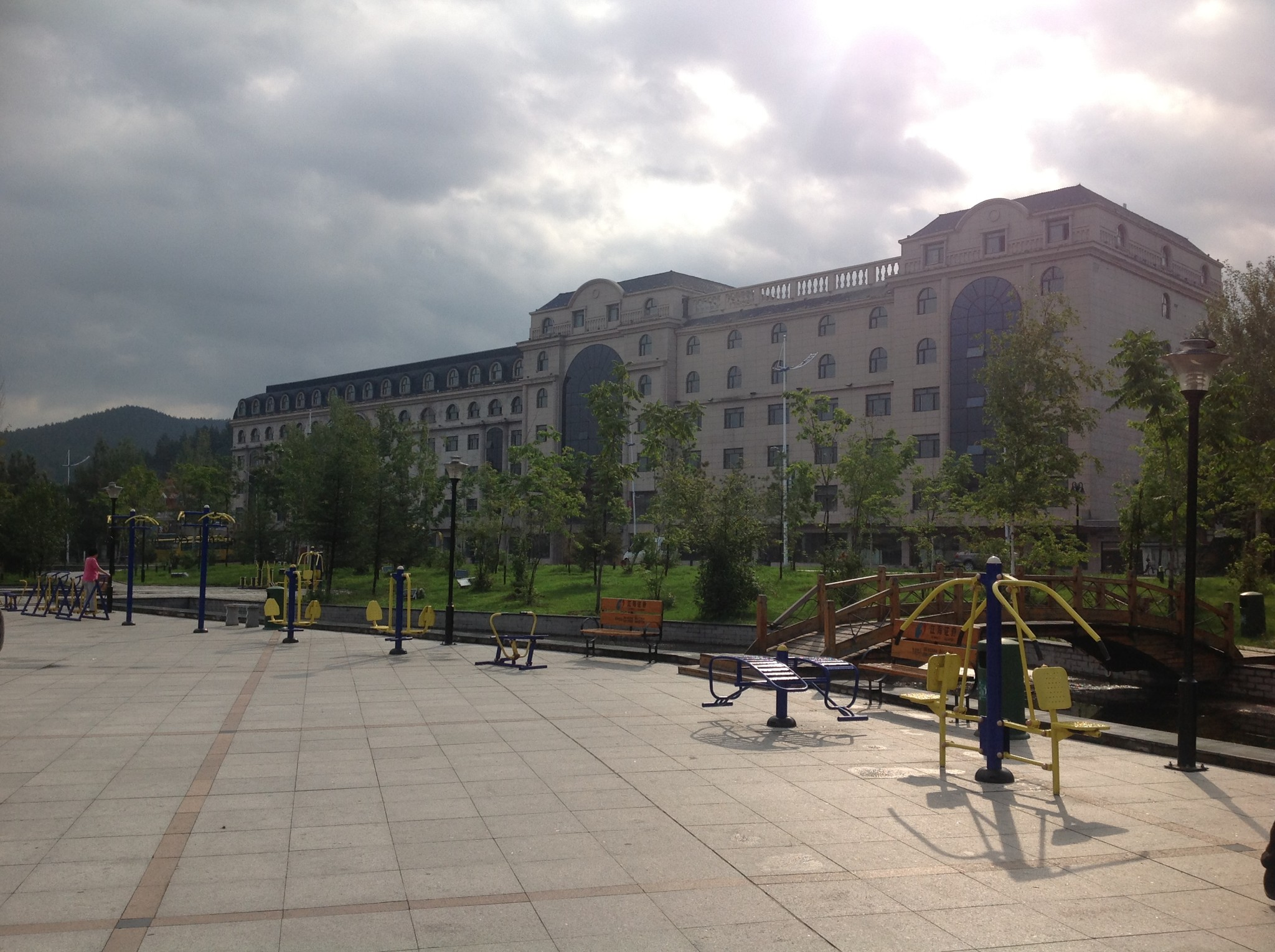

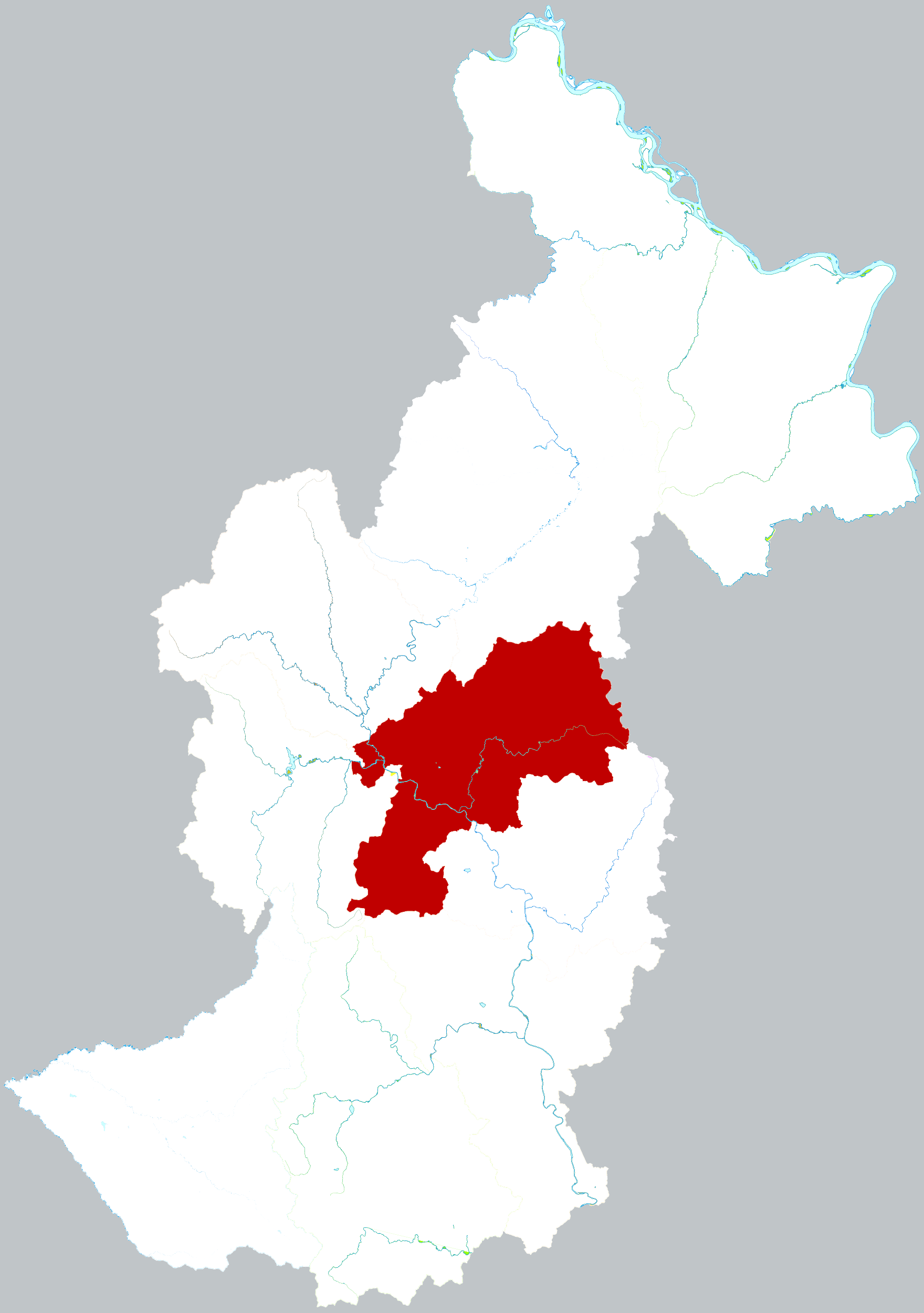
- Location of Yimei District in Yichun

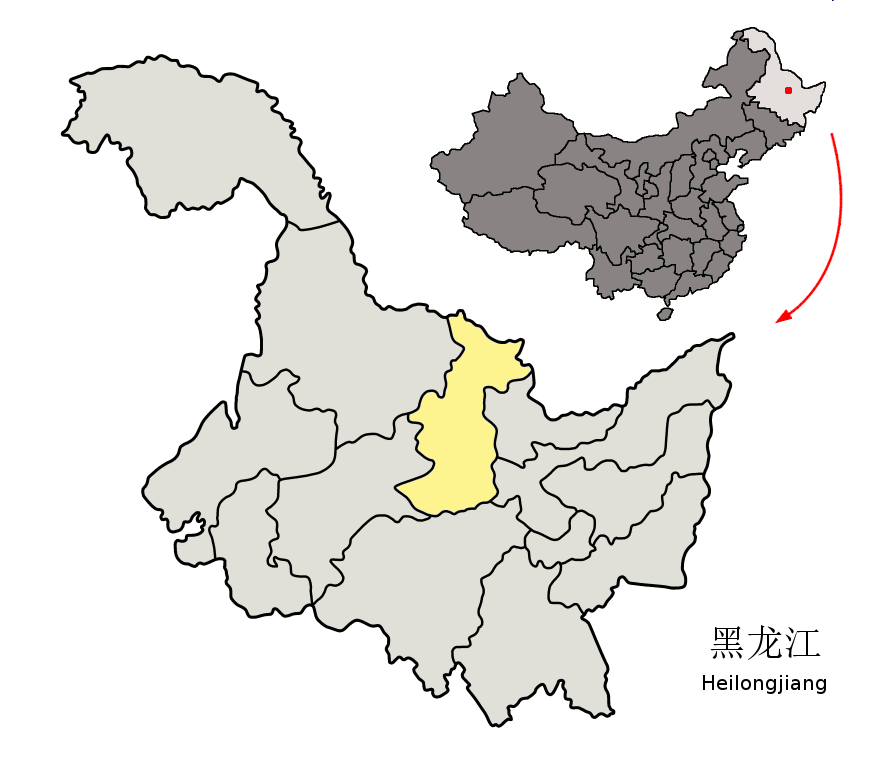
- Yichun in Heilongjiang
- Country: China
- Province: Heilongjiang
- Prefecture-level city: Yichun
- District seat: Xuri Subdistrict

Area
  - Total: 2,359 km^{2} (911 sq mi)

Population (2020 census)
  - Total: 173,320
  - Density: 73.47/km^{2} (190.3/sq mi)
- Time zone: UTC+8 (China Standard)
- Website: www.ycym.gov.cn

Yimei District (Chinese: 伊美区; pinyin: Yīměi Qū) is one of four districts of the prefecture-level city of Yichun, Heilongjiang, China. It was established by merging the former Yichun District, Meixi District and parts of Wumahe District approved by the Chinese State Council in 2019. Its administrative centre is at Xuri Subdistrict (旭日街道).

== Administrative divisions ==
Yimei District is divided into 6 subdistricts and 2 towns.

6 subdistricts

- Chaoyang (朝阳街道), Qianjin (前进街道), Hongsheng (红升街道), Xuri (旭日街道), Xinxin (新欣街道), Nanjun (南郡街道)

2 towns

- Dongsheng Town (东升镇), Meixi Town (美溪镇)
