= Wucui District =

Wucui 乌翠区
- District
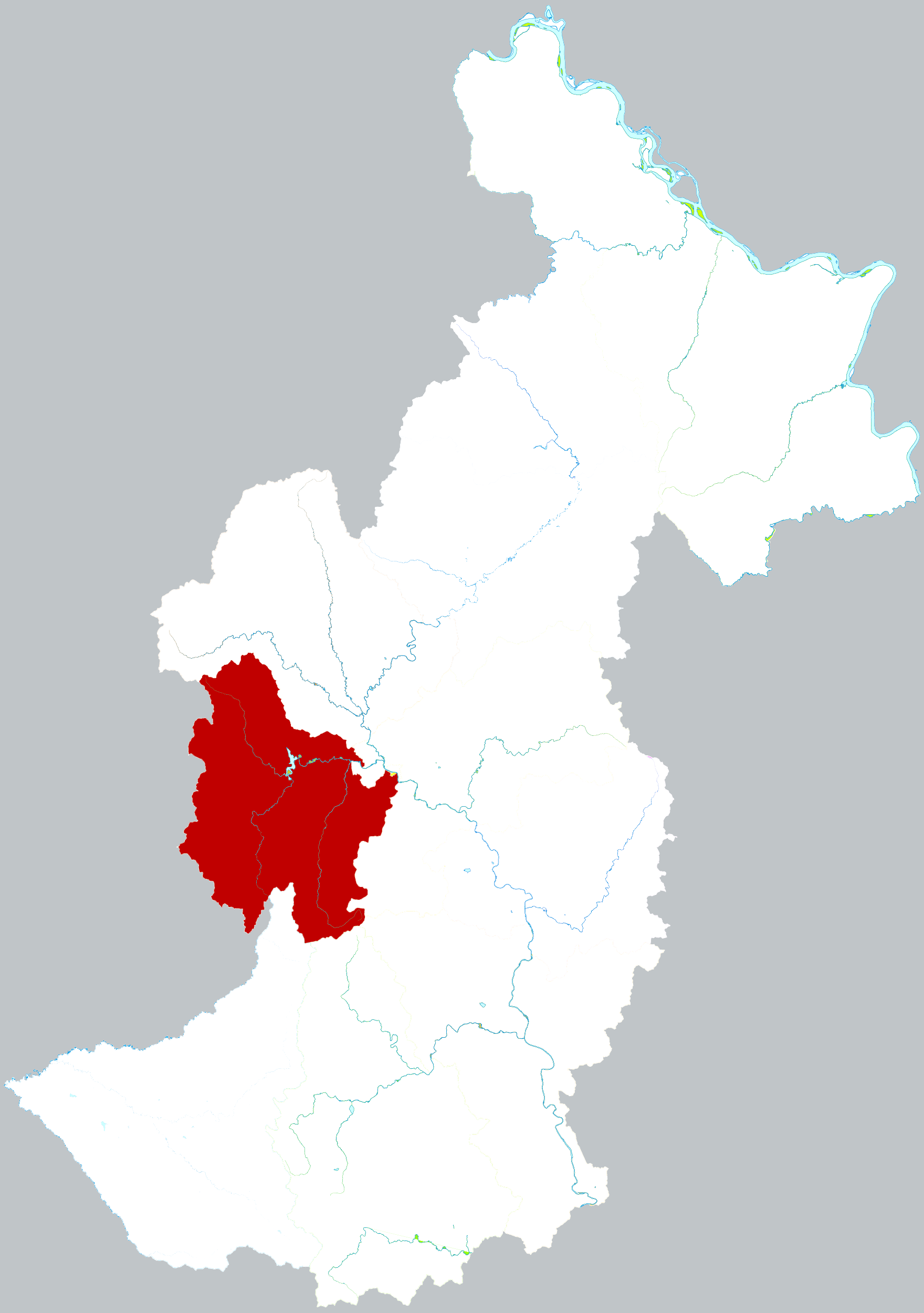
- Location of Wucui District in Yichun

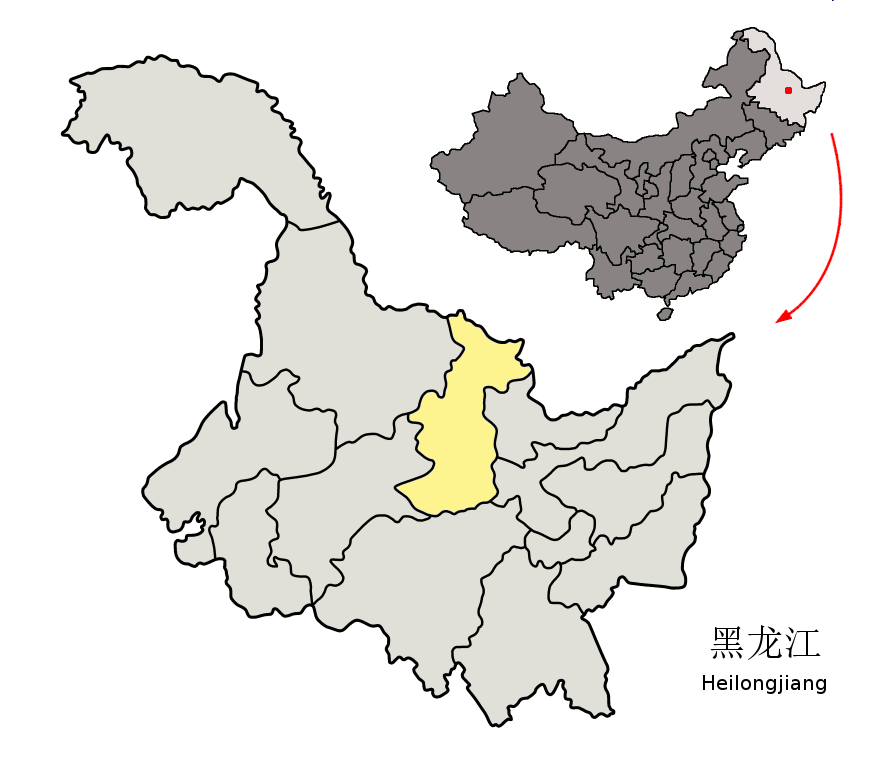
- Yichun in Heilongjiang
- Country: People's Republic of China
- Province: Heilongjiang
- Prefecture-level city: Yichun

Area
  - Total: 2,814 km^{2} (1,086 sq mi)

Population (2010)
  - Total: 76,376
  - Density: 27.14/km^{2} (70.30/sq mi)
- Time zone: UTC+8 (China Standard)

Wucui District (Chinese: 乌翠区; pinyin: Wūcuì Qū) is one of four districts of the prefecture-level city of Yichun, Heilongjiang, China. It was established by merging the former Cuiluan District and parts of Wumahe District approved by the Chinese State Council in 2019. Its administrative centre is at Shuguang Subdistrict (曙光街道).

== Administrative divisions ==
Wucui District is divided into 4 subdistricts.

4 subdistricts

- Umahe (乌马河街道), Jinshan (锦山街道), Shuguang (曙光街道), Xiangyang (向阳街道)
