= Hongxing District =

Hongxing 红星区
- District
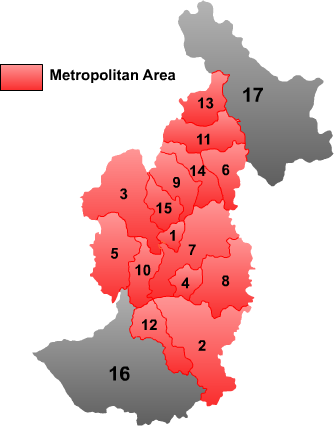
- Location of Hongxing ("14") within Yichun City

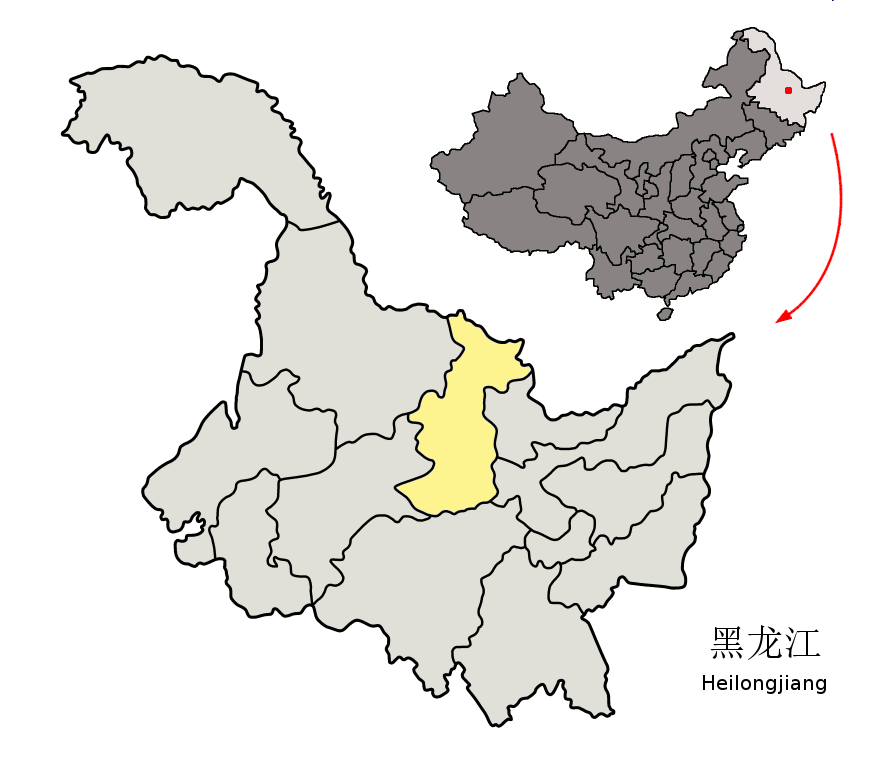
- Location of Yichun City in Heilongjiang
- Coordinates: 48°14′22″N 129°23′28″E
- Country: People's Republic of China
- Province: Heilongjiang
- Prefecture-level city: Yichun

Area
  - Total: 3,042 km^{2} (1,175 sq mi)

Population (2003)
  - Total: 30,000
  - Density: 9.9/km^{2} (26/sq mi)
- Time zone: UTC+8 (China Standard)

Hongxing District (simplified Chinese: 红星区; traditional Chinese: 紅星區; pinyin: Hóngxīng Qū; lit. 'red star') is a district of the city of Yichun, Heilongjiang province, People's Republic of China. In 2019, the district was merged with Xinqing District and Wuying District to form Fenglin County.
