= G1111 Hegang–Harbin Expressway =

Expressway in China

Hegang–Harbin Expressway
- 鹤岗－哈尔滨高速公路
- Heha Expressway 鹤哈高速公路

Route information
- Auxiliary route of G11
- Part of AH31
- Length: 306 km (190 mi) 457 When completed

Major junctions
- Northeast end: Hegang, Heilongjiang (when complete); Yichun, Heilongjiang (current)
- Southwest end: G1001 Harbin Ring Expressway, Harbin, Heilongjiang

Location
- Country: China

Highway system
- National Trunk Highway System; Primary; Auxiliary; National Highways; Transport in China
← G11	→ G1112

The G1111 Hegang–Harbin Expressway (Chinese: 鹤岗—哈尔滨高速公路), commonly referred to as the Heha Expressway (Chinese: 鹤哈高速公路), is an expressway that connects the cities of Hegang, Heilongjiang, China, and Harbin, Heilongjiang. The expressway is a spur of G11 Hegang–Dalian Expressway.

The expressway connects the following cities, all of which are in Heilongjiang Province:

- Hegang
- Yichun
- Suihua
- Harbin

The expressway is currently complete from Yichun to Harbin and under construction from Hegang to Yichun.

== Detailed Itinerary ==
From North to South
	S307 Road; Yichun
Yichun Urban Area
Toll Station
	G222 Road; Cuiluan
Service Area
	S12 Qiannen Expressway
	U-Turn
	G222 Road; Riyuexia Riyuexia Service Area
	G222 Road; Tieli
	Shuangfeng; Towards G222 Road
Qing'an Service Area
	G222 Road; Qing'an
Suihua Service Area
	G222 Road; Suihua-North
	S15 Suibei Expressway; G222 Road; Suihua-South
	Hongguang
	Kangjin-Xubao; Towards G222 Road
Kangjin Service Area
	G222 Road; Hulan
446	G202 Road; Hulan-Leye
	AH31 G1001 Harbin Ring Expressway
From South to North
