= List of highways numbered 220 =

Route 220 or Highway 220 may refer to:

== Australia ==
- Sunraysia Highway

== Canada ==
- Manitoba Provincial Road 220
- Newfoundland and Labrador Route 220
- Quebec Route 220
- Saskatchewan Highway 220

== China ==
- China National Highway 220 (G220)

== Costa Rica ==
- National Route 220

== Japan ==
- Japan National Route 220

== United Kingdom ==
- A220 road
- B220 road

== United States ==
- Interstate 220
- U.S. Route 220
- Arkansas Highway 220
- California State Route 220
- Georgia State Route 220
- Iowa Highway 220
- Kentucky Route 220
- Maine State Route 220
- Route 220 (Connecticut–Massachusetts)
- Minnesota State Highway 220
- New Mexico State Road 220
- New York State Route 220
- Ohio State Route 220
- Tennessee State Route 220
- Texas State Highway 220
- Utah State Route 220 (former)
- Washington State Route 220 (former)
- Wyoming Highway 220

Preceded by 219	Lists of highways 220	Succeeded by 221
