= Jinlin District =

Jinlin 金林区
- District
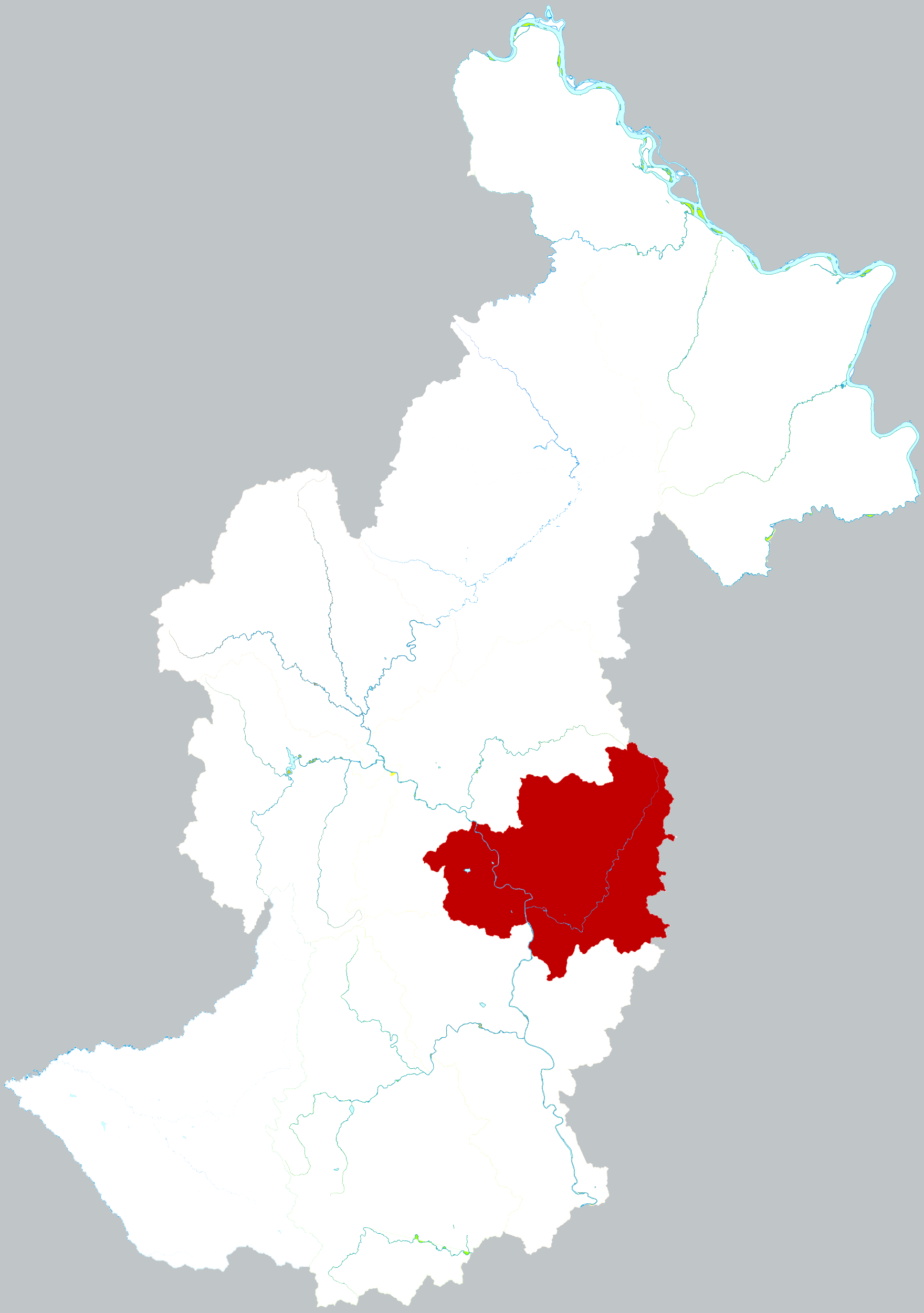
- Location of Jinlin District in Yichun

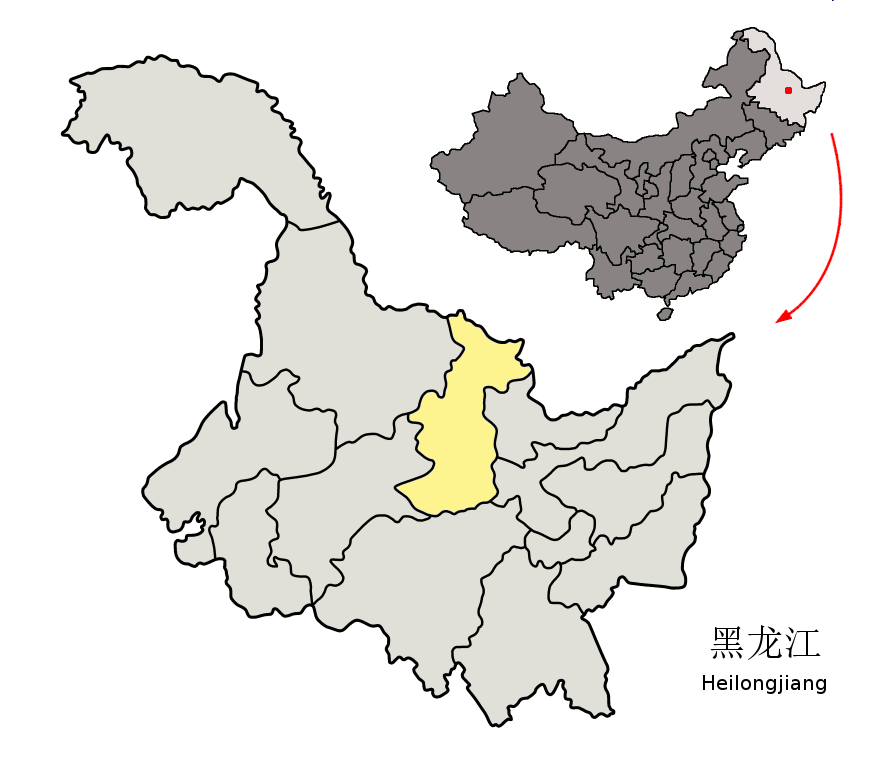
- Yichun in Heilongjiang
- Country: People's Republic of China
- Province: Heilongjiang
- Prefecture-level city: Yichun

Area
  - Total: 2,307 km^{2} (891 sq mi)

Population (2010)
  - Total: 91,959
  - Density: 39.86/km^{2} (103.2/sq mi)
- Time zone: UTC+8 (China Standard)

Jinlin District (Chinese: 金林区; pinyin: Jīnlín Qū) is one of four districts of the prefecture-level city of Yichun, Heilongjiang, China. It was established by merging the former Jinshantun District and Xilin District approved by the Chinese State Council in 2019. Its administrative centre is at Fendou Subdistrict (奋斗街道).

== Administrative divisions ==
Jinlin District is divided into 2 towns.

2 towns

- Xilin (西林镇), Jinshantun (金山屯镇)
