= Tangwang County =

County in Heilongjiang Province, China

Tangwang 汤旺县
- County
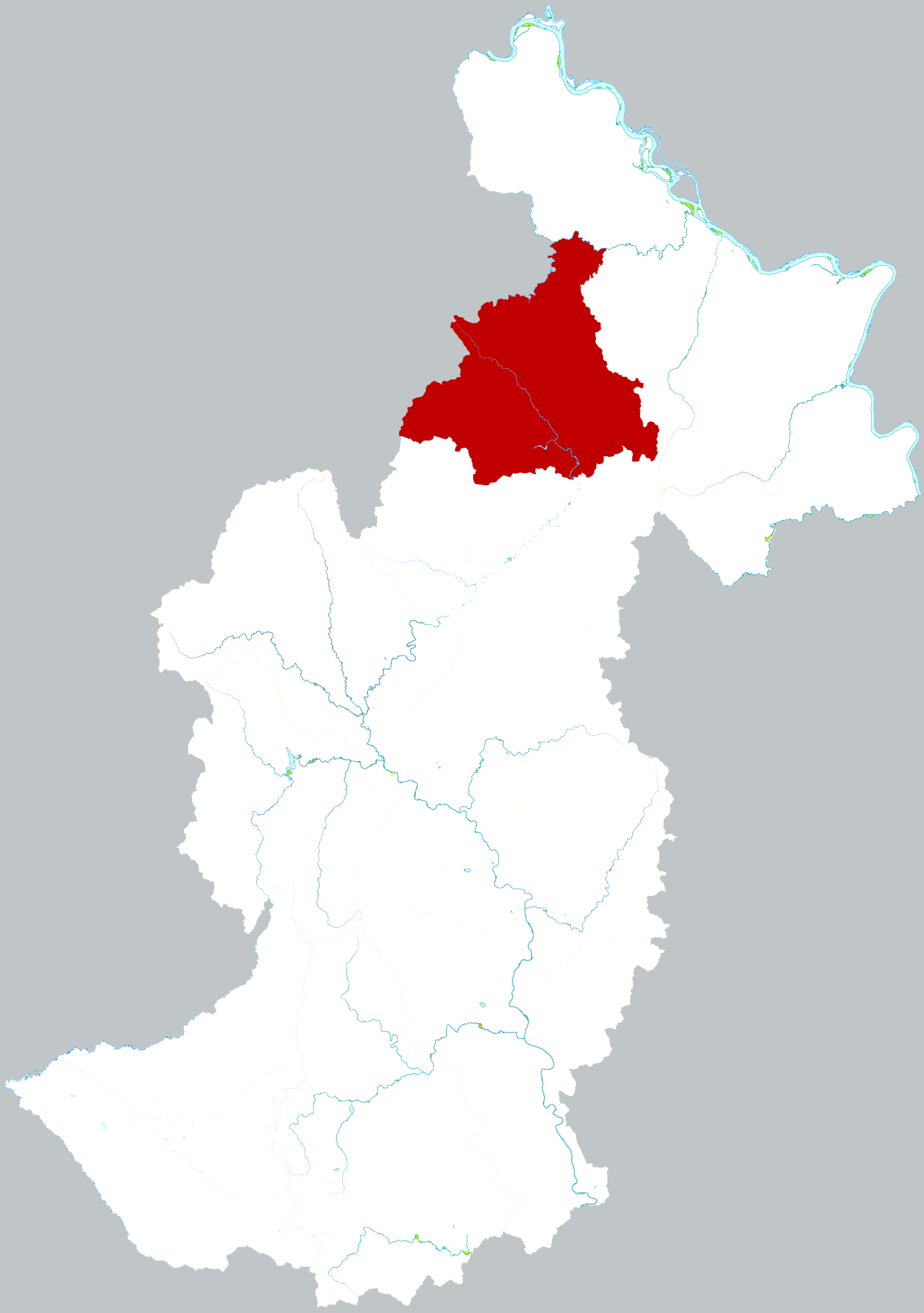
- Location of Tangwang County in Yichun

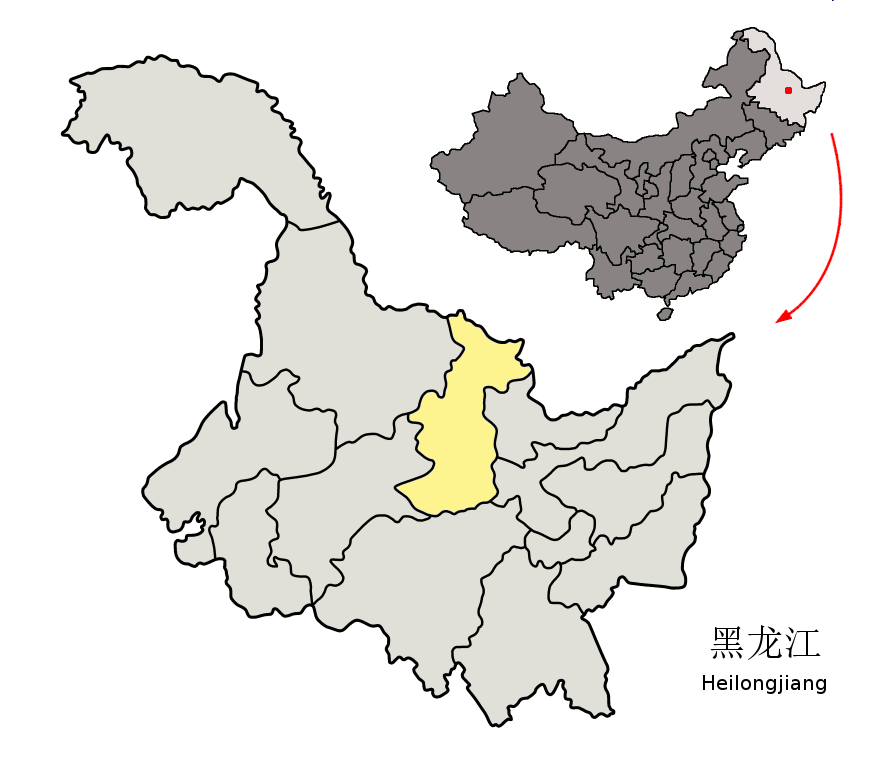
- Yichun in Heilongjiang
- Country: People's Republic of China
- Province: Heilongjiang
- Prefecture-level city: Yichun

Area
  - Total: 4,425 km^{2} (1,709 sq mi)

Population (2010)
  - Total: 52,126
  - Density: 11.78/km^{2} (30.51/sq mi)
- Time zone: UTC+8 (China Standard)

Tangwang County (Chinese: 汤旺县; pinyin: Tāngwàng Xiàn) is a county in Heilongjiang Province, China. It is under the administration of the prefecture-level city of Yichun. The county was established by merging the former Wuyiling District and Tangwanghe District approved by the Chinese State Council in 2019. The county seat is Henan Subdistrict (河南街道).

== Administrative divisions ==
Tangwang County is divided into 9 areas, and 1 subdistrict.

9 areas

- Xing'an Shequ (兴安社区地区), Wenhua Shequ (文化社区地区), Zhenxing Shequ (振兴社区地区), Nanshan Shequ (南山社区地区), Xiangyang Shequ (向阳社区地区), Xingfu Shequ (幸福社区地区), Xinfeng Shequ (新风社区地区), Jianshe Shequ (建设社区地区), Lintie Shequ (林铁社区地区)

1 subdistrict

- Xiangyang Shequ (向阳社区街道)
