= Fenglin County =

Fenglin 丰林县
- County
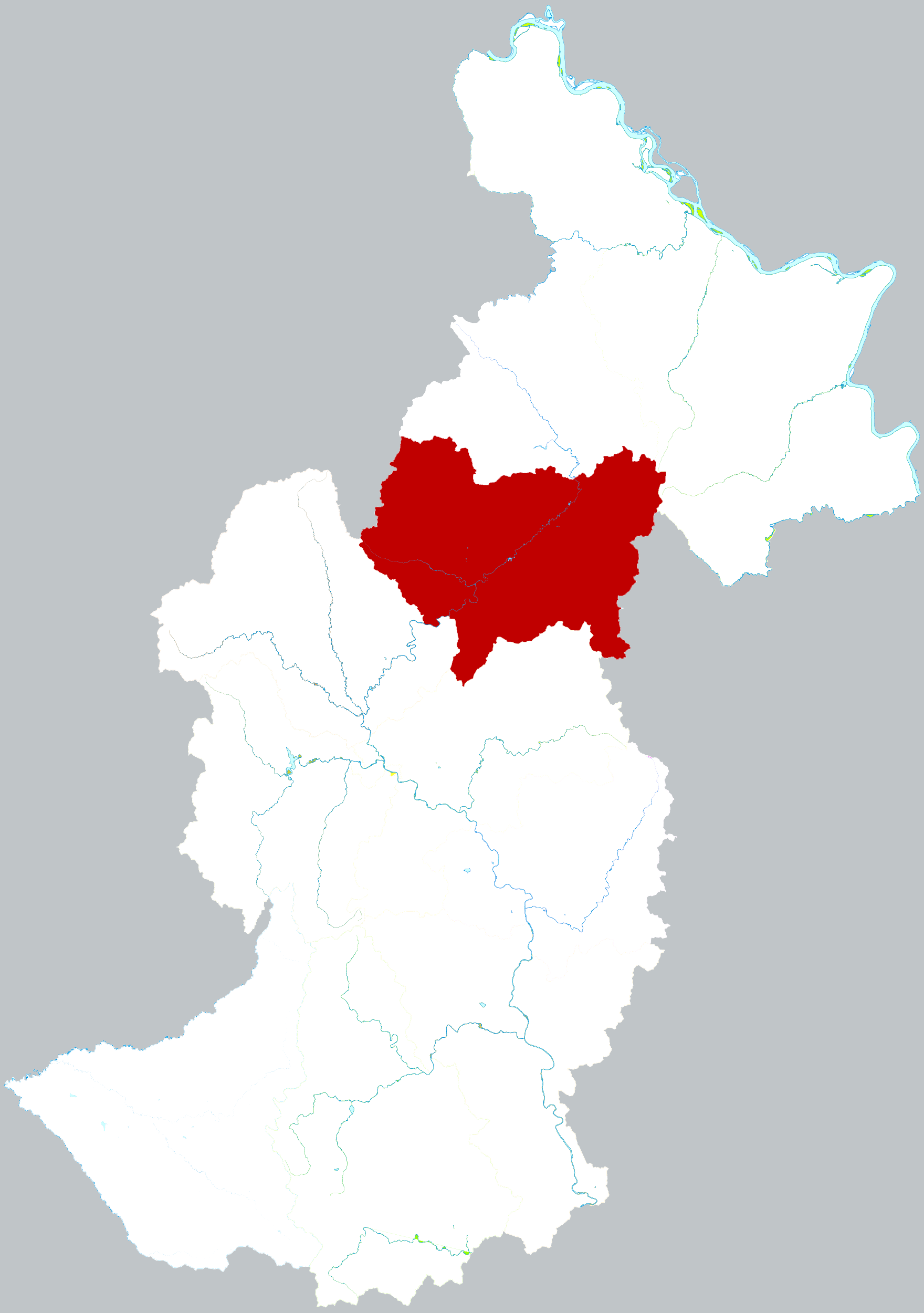
- Location of Fenglin County in Yichun

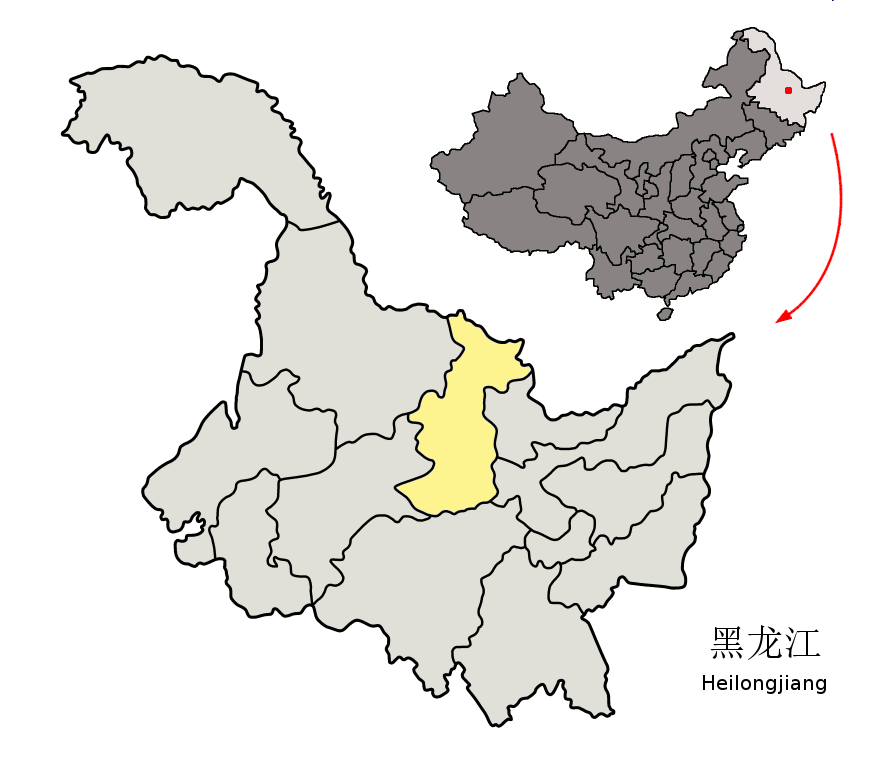
- Yichun in Heilongjiang
- Country: People's Republic of China
- Province: Heilongjiang
- Prefecture-level city: Yichun

Area
  - Total: 5,263 km^{2} (2,032 sq mi)

Population (2010)
  - Total: 98,894
  - Density: 18.79/km^{2} (48.67/sq mi)
- Time zone: UTC+8 (China Standard)

Fenglin County (Chinese: 丰林县; pinyin: Fēnglín Xiàn) is a county in Heilongjiang Province, China. It is under the administration of the prefecture-level city of Yichun. The county was established by merging the former Xinqing District, Wuying District and Hongxing District approved by the Chinese State Council in 2019. The county seat is Xinqing Subdistrict (新青街道).

== Administrative divisions ==
Fenglin County is divided into 14 subdistricts.

14 subdistricts

- Liming Shequ (黎明社区街道), Hongjianzhongxin Shequ (红建中心社区街道), Xinmin Shequ (新民社区街道), Fumin Shequ (富民社区街道), Yulinyi Shequ (育林一社区街道), Xinlizhongxin Shequ (新立中心社区街道), Dongsheng Shequ (东升社区街道), Qianjin Shequ (前进社区街道), Tuanjie Shequ (团结社区街道), Yulin Shequ (育林社区街道), Jianlin Shequ (建林社区街道), Songlin Shequ (松林社区街道), Xinlin Shequ (新林社区街道), Wuxing Shequ (五星社区街道)
