= List of highways numbered 221 =

The following highways are numbered 221:

== Canada ==
- Manitoba Provincial Road 221
- Newfoundland and Labrador Route 221
- Nova Scotia Route 221
- Prince Edward Island Route 221
- Quebec Route 221
- Saskatchewan Highway 221

== China ==
- China National Highway 221

== Cuba ==
- Santa Clara–Sagua Road (4–221)

== Costa Rica ==
- National Route 221

== Japan ==
- Japan National Route 221

== United Kingdom ==
- A221 road
- B221 road

== United States ==
- U.S. Route 221
- Alabama State Route 221
- Arkansas Highway 221
- California State Route 221
- Florida State Road 221 (former)
- Georgia State Route 221 (former)
- Iowa Highway 221 (former)
- K-221 (Kansas highway) (former)
- Kentucky Route 221
- Maine State Route 221
- Minnesota State Highway 221 (former)
- Montana Secondary Highway 221
- Nevada State Route 221
- New Mexico State Road 221
- New York State Route 221
- Ohio State Route 221
- Oregon Route 221
- Pennsylvania Route 221
- Tennessee State Route 221
- Texas State Highway 221 (former)
  - Texas State Highway Loop 221 (former)
- Utah State Route 221 (former)
- Washington State Route 221
- Wyoming Highway 221

Preceded by 220	Lists of highways 221	Succeeded by 222
