= Yichun City =

Yichun City could refer to:

- Yichun, Heilongjiang (伊春市), prefecture-level city in Heilongjiang, China
- Yichun, Jiangxi (宜春), prefecture-level city in Jiangxi, China
