= Meixi =

Meixi is an atonal pinyin romanization of various Chinese names, including:

- Meixi District (美溪区) in Yichun, Heilongjiang, PRC
- Meixi (梅溪镇) in Minqing Co., Fujian, PRC
- Meixi River (梅溪河) in northeastern Chongqing Municipality, PRC
