= Youhao District =

Coordinates: 47°51′22″N 128°50′19″E

Youhao 友好区
- District
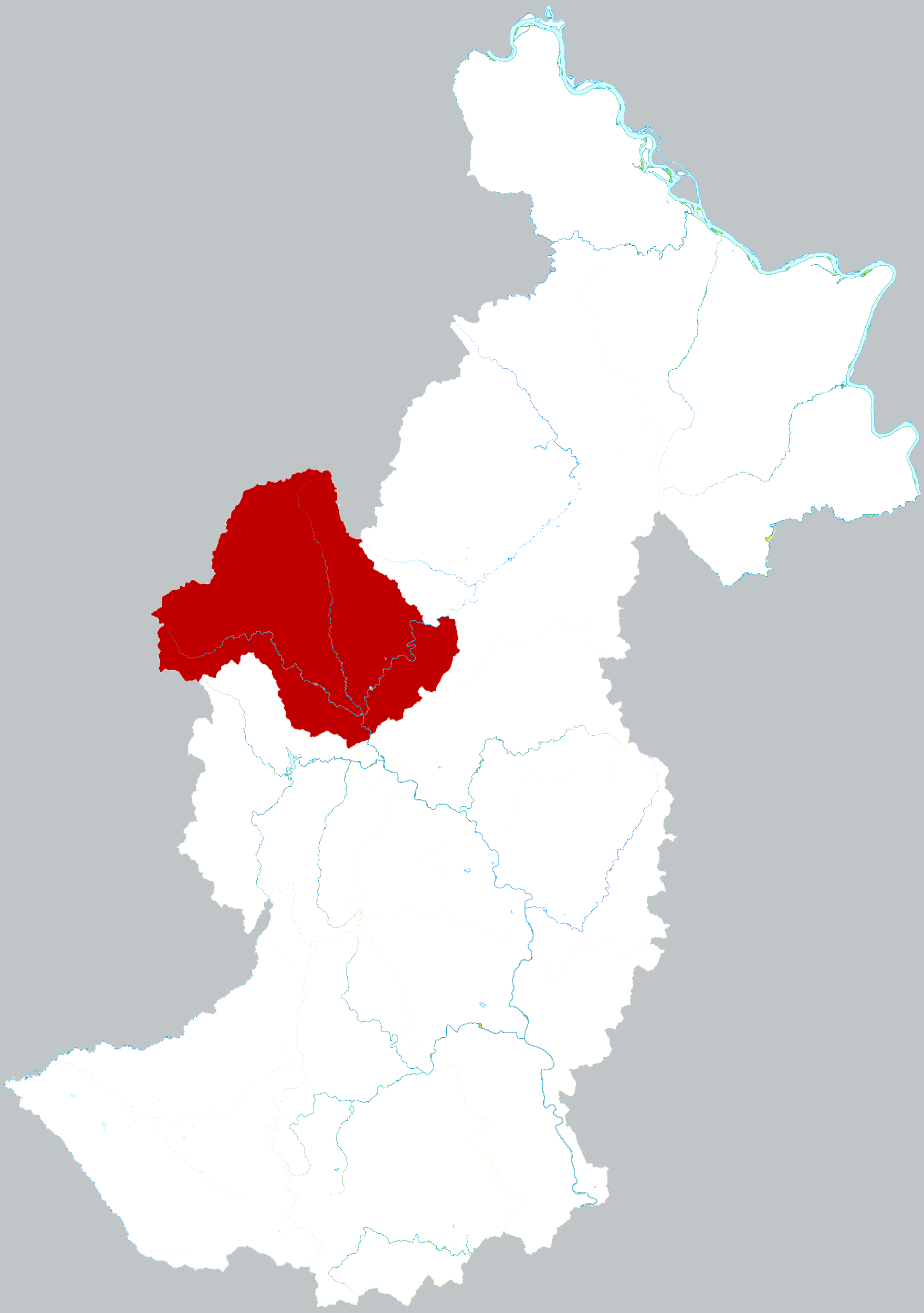
- Location of Youhao District in Yichun

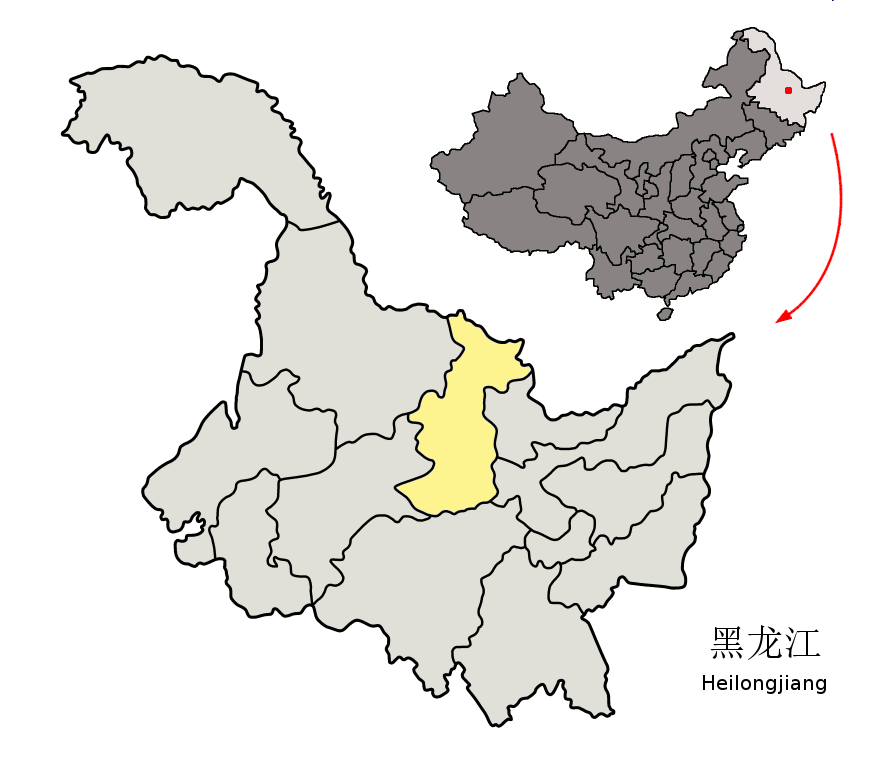
- Yichun in Heilongjiang
- Country: People's Republic of China
- Province: Heilongjiang
- Prefecture-level city: Yichun
- District seat: No.168, Youhao Avenue (友好大街168号)

Area
  - Total: 2,347.55 km^{2} (906.39 sq mi)

Population (2010)
  - Total: 66,000
  - Density: 28/km^{2} (73/sq mi)
- Time zone: UTC+8 (China Standard)
- Postal code: 153031
- Website: yhq.gov.cn

Youhao District (Chinese: 友好区; pinyin: Yǒuhǎo Qū) is one of four districts of the prefecture-level city of Yichun, Heilongjiang, China. The former Shangganling District was amalgamated with it in 2019. Its administrative centre is at Youhao Subdistrict (友好街道).

== Administrative divisions ==
Youhao District is divided into 7 subdistricts.

7 subdistricts

- Shuangzihe Shequ (双子河社区街道), Xianfeng Shequ (先锋社区街道), Binshui Shequ (滨水社区街道), Qianjin Shequ (前进社区街道), Xiangyang Shequ (向阳社区街道), Baoan Shequ (保安社区街道), Tiexing Shequ (铁兴社区街道)
