= Shuguang =

Shuguang (曙光) may refer to:

- Shuguang (spacecraft), a proposed Chinese crewed spacecraft that was never built
- Sugon or Shuguang, Chinese supercomputer manufacturer
- SG Automotive or Shuguang Automotive, a Chinese vehicle and component manufacturer
- Break Free (TV series), a 2013 Malaysian-Singaporean TV series

== Places in China ==
Heilongjiang

- Shuguang Township, Heilongjiang, a township in Keshan County
- Shuguang Subdistrict, Daxing'anling, a subdistrict in Jiagedaqi District, Daxing'anling Prefecture
- Shuguang Subdistrict, Yichun, a subdistrict in Cuiluan District, Yichun

Jilin

- Shuguang, Meihekou, a town in Meihekou
- Shuguang Subdistrict, Changchun, a subdistrict in Nanguan District, Changchun

Liaoning

- Shuguang, Liaoyang, a town in Liaoyang
- Shuguang Subdistrict, Anshan, a subdistrict in Lishan District, Anshan
- Shuguang Subdistrict, Panjin, a subdistrict in Xinglongtai District, Panjin

Other provinces

- Shuguang Subdistrict, Beijing, a subdistrict in Haidian District, Beijing
- Shuguang, Guizhou, a town in Nayong County, Guizhou
- Shuguang Township, Inner Mongolia, a township in Bayannur, Inner Mongolia
- Shuguang Township, Sichuan, a township in Santai County, Sichuan
- Shuguang Township, Yunnan, a township in Guangnan County, Yunnan
