= List of highways numbered 222 =

The following highways are numbered 222:

== Canada ==
- Manitoba Provincial Road 222
- Newfoundland and Labrador Route 222
- Prince Edward Island Route 222
- Quebec Route 222

== China ==
- China National Highway 222

== Costa Rica ==
- National Route 222

== Hungary ==
- Main road 222 (Hungary)

== India ==
- National Highway 222 (India)

== Japan ==
- Japan National Route 222

== Thailand ==
- Thailand Route 222

== United Kingdom ==
- A222 road
- B222 road

== United States ==
- Interstate 222 (future)
- U.S. Route 222
- Arkansas Highway 222
- California State Route 222
- Connecticut Route 222
- Florida State Road 222
- Georgia State Route 222 (former)
- K-222 (Kansas highway) (former)
- Kentucky Route 222
- Maine State Route 222
- Maryland Route 222
- M-222 (Michigan highway)
- Minnesota State Highway 222
- Montana Secondary Highway 222
- New York State Route 222
- North Carolina Highway 222
- Ohio State Route 222
- Oregon Route 222
- Pennsylvania Route 222
- Tennessee State Route 222
- Texas State Highway 222
- Utah State Route 222
- Virginia State Route 222
- Wyoming Highway 222

Preceded by 221	Lists of highways 222	Succeeded by 223
