= Daqingshan County =

Daqingshan 大箐山县
- County
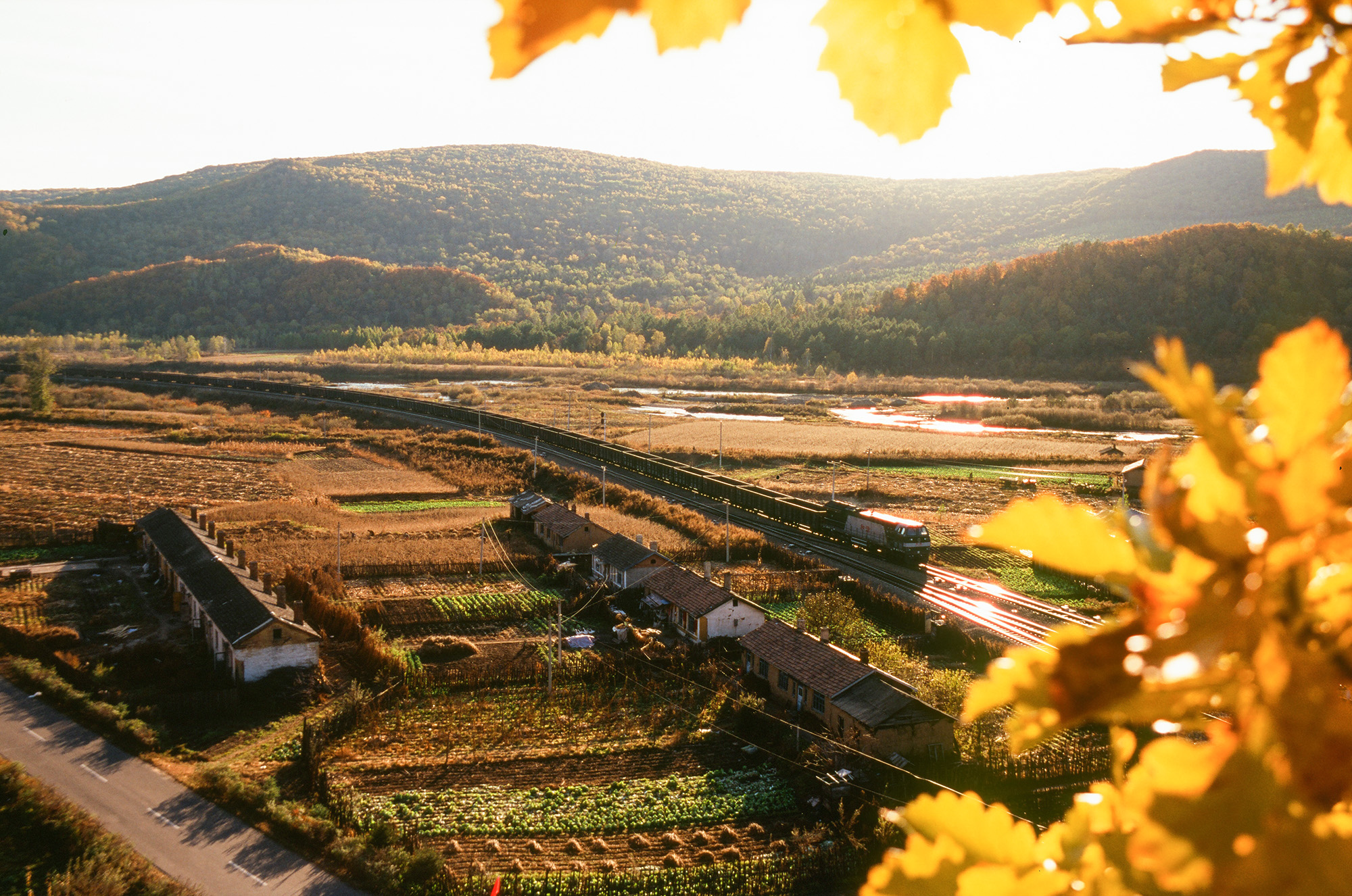

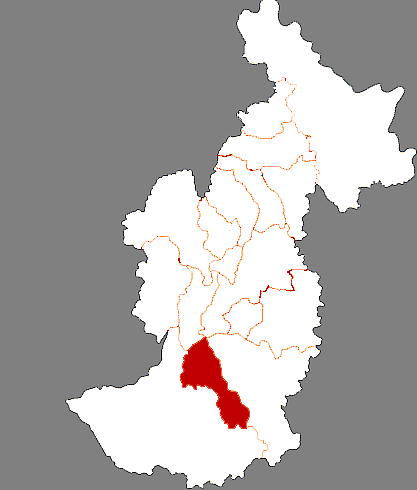
- Location of Dajingshan in Yichun

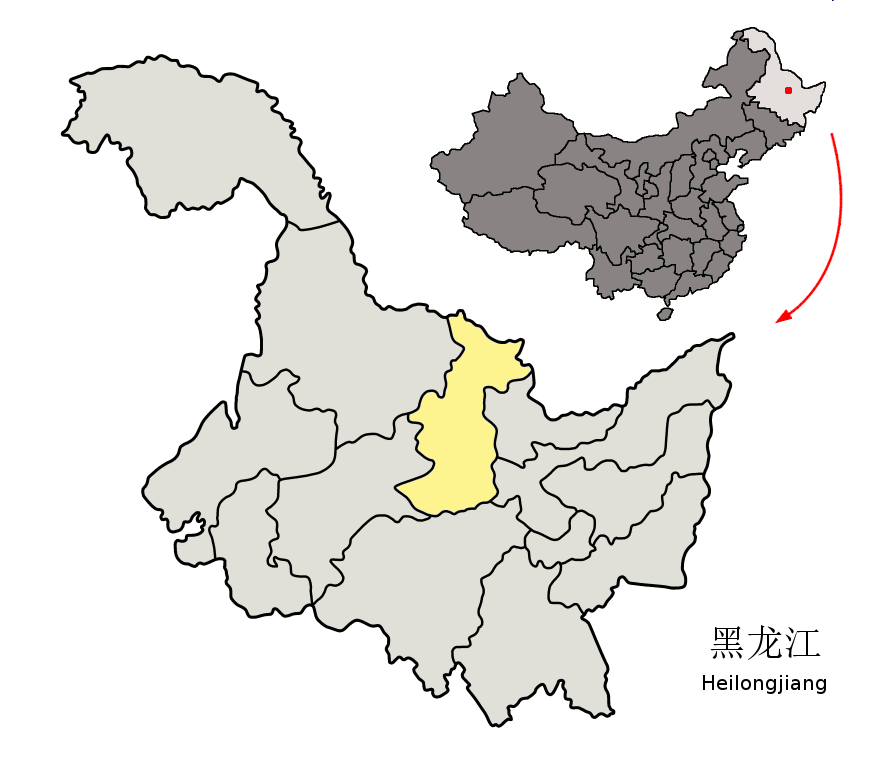
- Yichun in Heilongjiang
- Coordinates: 47°01′41″N 129°01′26″E
- Country: People's Republic of China
- Province: Heilongjiang
- Prefecture-level city: Yichun
- District seat: Dailing Subdistrict (带岭街道)

Area
  - Total: 1,041 km^{2} (402 sq mi)

Population (2014)
  - Total: 35,522
  - Density: 34.12/km^{2} (88.38/sq mi)
- Time zone: UTC+8 (China Standard)
- Postal code: 153106
- Website: ycdlq.gov.cn

Daqingshan County (Chinese: 大箐山县; pinyin: Dàqìngshān xiàn) is a county in Heilongjiang Province, China. It is under the administration of the prefecture-level city of Yichun. The county was established by merging the former Dailing District (带岭区) and Langxiang Town (朗乡镇) of Tieli City approved by the Chinese State Council in 2019. The county seat is Dailing Subdistrict (带岭街道).

== Administrative divisions ==
Dajingshan is divided into five subdistricts: Tuanjie Subdistrict (团结社区街道), Yuxi Subdistrict (育西社区街道), Yongsheng Subdistrict (永胜社区街道), Tienan Subdistrict (铁南社区街道), and Binbei Subdistrict (宾北社区街道). The only town is Langxiang (朗乡镇).
