= Nancha County =

Nancha 南岔县
- County
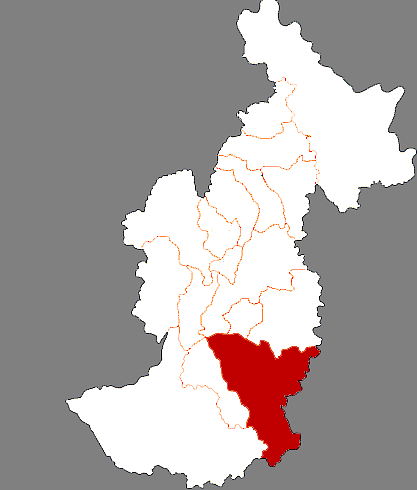
- Location of Nancha District in Yichun

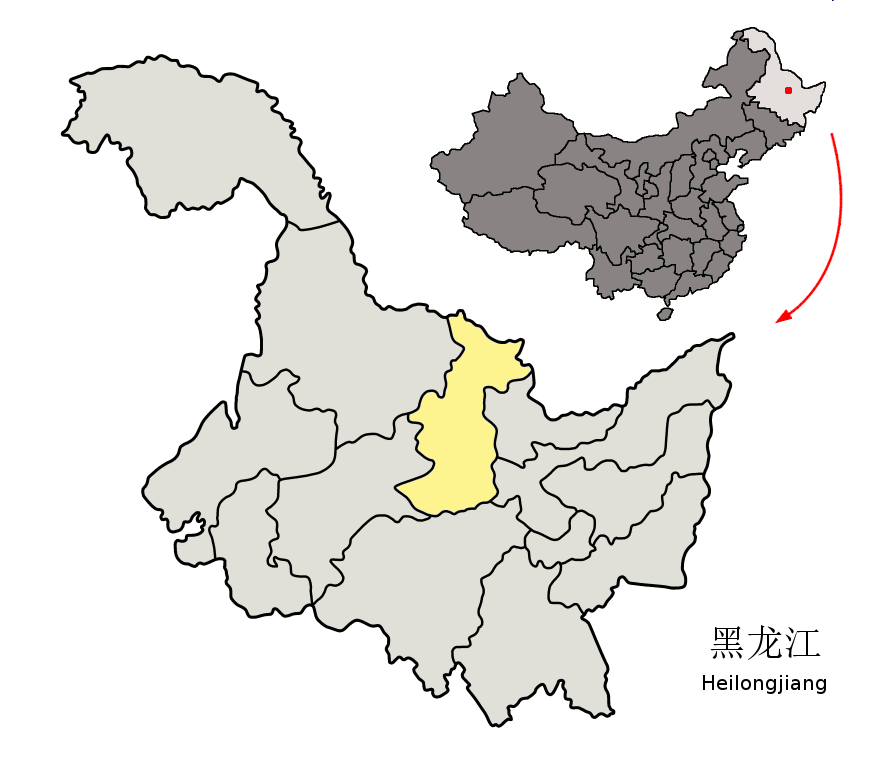
- Yichun in Heilongjiang
- Coordinates: 47°08′17″N 129°16′59″E
- Country: People's Republic of China
- Province: Heilongjiang
- Prefecture-level city: Yichun
- District seat: District Committee of Nancha (南岔区委)

Area
  - Total: 3,088.41 km^{2} (1,192.44 sq mi)

Population (2014)
  - Total: 134,581
  - Density: 43.5761/km^{2} (112.862/sq mi)
- Time zone: UTC+8 (China Standard)
- Postal code: 153100
- Website: nancha.gov.cn

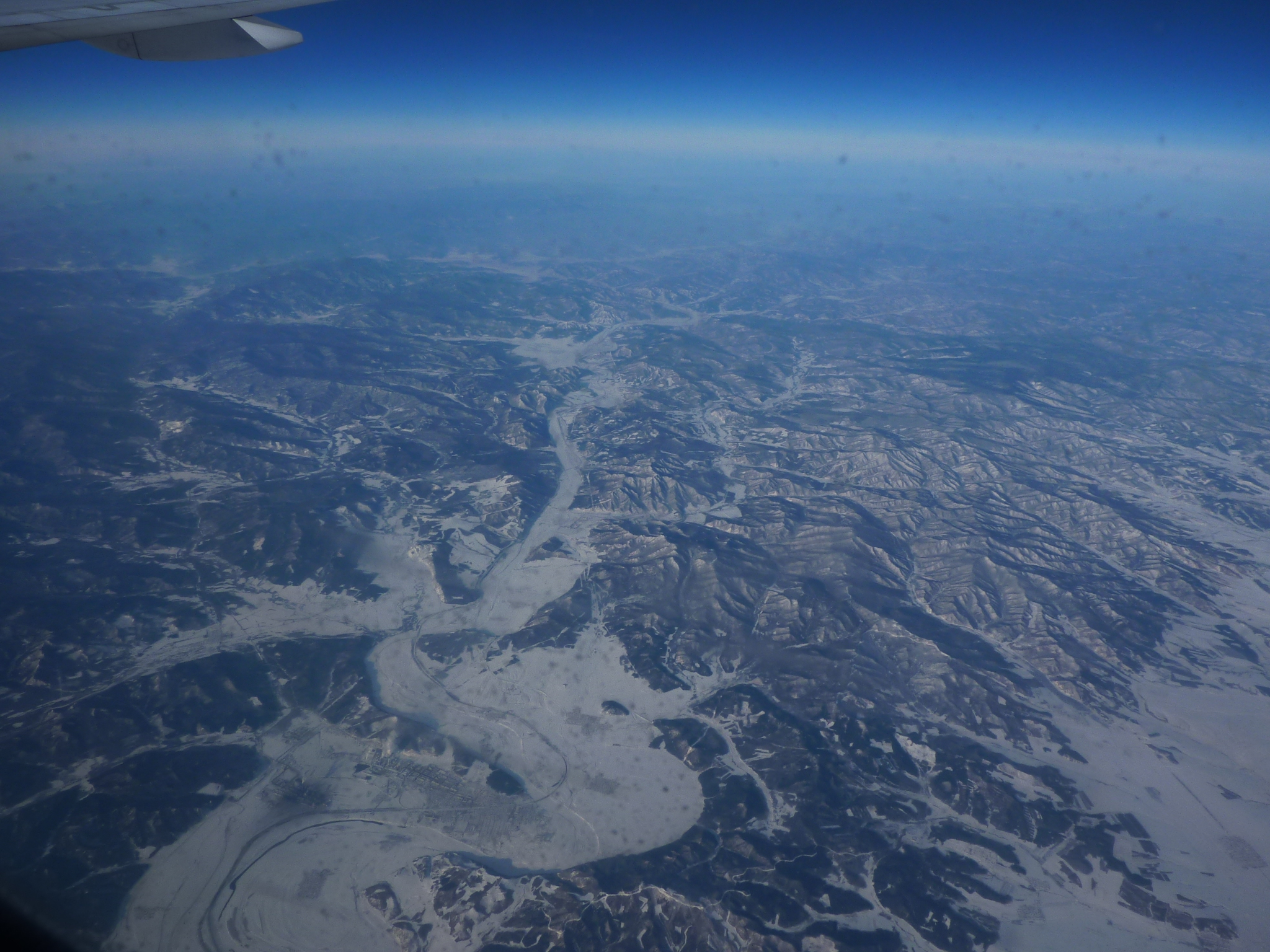
An aerial view of the valley of the Tangwang River (a left tributary of the Sungari) in and around Haolinghe Town, Nancha. Looking roughly north. The river forms a winding valley as it passes through the Qinghei Mountains (Qingheishan), a southern branch of the Lesser Khingan. One can see the Jiamusi-Nancha railway winding its way across the mountain range, more or less following the river valley. Haolinghe Town center is at the large river bend, toward the lower left part of the picture.

Nancha (Chinese: 南岔县; pinyin: Nánchà xiàn) is a county in Heilongjiang Province, China. It is under the administration of the prefecture-level city of Yichun. The county was re-organized from the former Nancha District (南岔区) by the Chinese State Council in 2019. The county seat is Lianhe Subdistrict (联合街道).

== Administrative divisions ==
Nancha County is divided into 3 towns and 1 township.

3 towns

- Nancha (南岔镇), Chenming (晨明镇), Haolianghe (浩良河镇)

1 township

- Yingchun (迎春乡)
