= China National Highway 222 =

Road in China

National Highway 222
- 222国道

Route information
- Length: 363 km (226 mi)

Major junctions
- From: Harbin in Heilongjiang
- To: Yichun in Heilongjiang

Location
- Country: China

Highway system
- National Trunk Highway System; Primary; Auxiliary
← G221	→ G223

China National Highway 222 (222国道) runs from Harbin to Yichun in Heilongjiang.

It runs to approximately 2420 km, and runs northwest from Harbin. The entire highway lies within Heilongjiang Province.

== Route and distance ==
Route and distance

City	Distance (km)
Harbin, Heilongjiang	0
Hulan, Heilongjiang	35
Suihua, Heilongjiang	127
Qing'an, Heilongjiang	180
Tieli, Heilongjiang	228
Cuiluan District, Heilongjiang	337
Wumahe District, Heilongjiang	355
Yichun, Heilongjiang	363

== See also ==
- China National Highways
