= Wuyiling District =

Coordinates: 48°35′24″N 129°26′16″E

Wuyiling District 乌伊岭区
- District
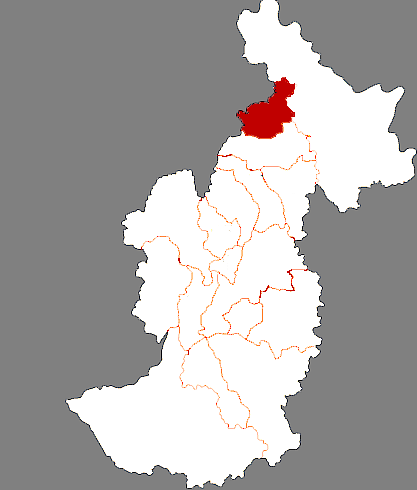
- Location of Wuyiling District in Yichun

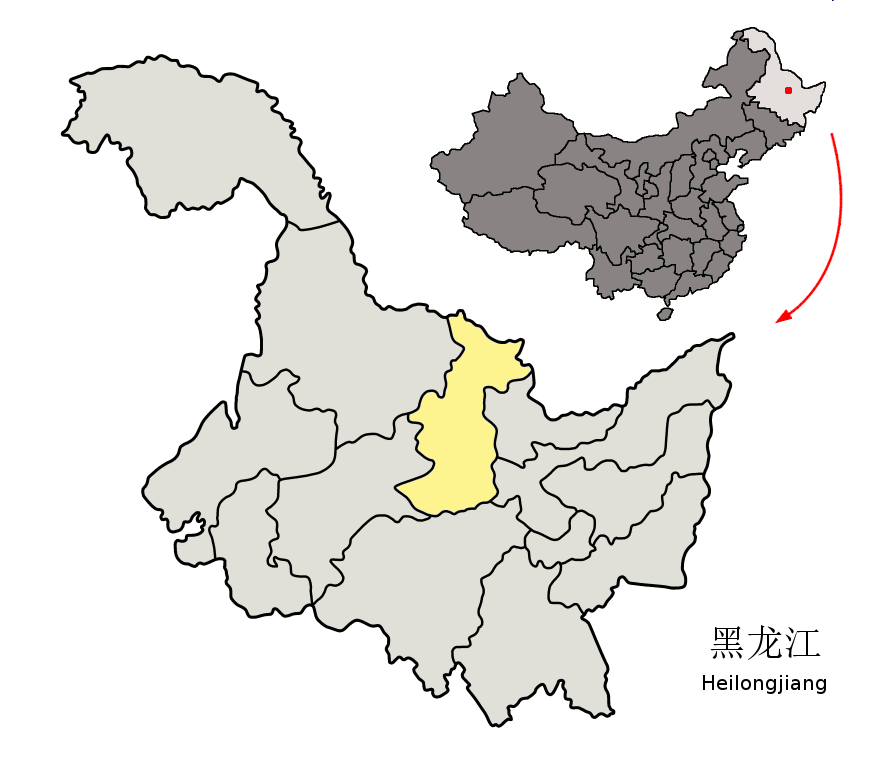
- Yichun in Heilongjiang
- Country: People's Republic of China
- Province: Heilongjiang
- Prefecture-level city: Yichun
- District seat: No.20, Youyi Road (友谊路20号)

Area
  - Total: 924 km^{2} (357 sq mi)

Population (2015)
  - Total: 23,800
  - Density: 25.8/km^{2} (66.7/sq mi)
- Time zone: UTC+8 (China Standard)
- Postal code: 153038
- Website: ycwyl.gov.cn

Wuyiling District (simplified Chinese: 乌伊岭区; traditional Chinese: 烏伊嶺區; pinyin: Wūyīlǐng Qū) is a district of the prefecture-level city of Yichun, Heilongjiang province, China.

== Climate ==
Climate data for Wuyiling, elevation 405 m (1,329 ft), (1991–2020 normals)
Month	Jan	Feb	Mar	Apr	May	Jun	Jul	Aug	Sep	Oct	Nov	Dec	Year
Mean daily maximum °C (°F)	−14.5 (5.9)	−9.3 (15.3)	−1.3 (29.7)	9.4 (48.9)	18.0 (64.4)	23.0 (73.4)	25.8 (78.4)	23.7 (74.7)	18.1 (64.6)	8.5 (47.3)	−4.6 (23.7)	−13.9 (7.0)	6.9 (44.4)
Daily mean °C (°F)	−22.5 (−8.5)	−17.6 (0.3)	−8.2 (17.2)	3.3 (37.9)	11.1 (52.0)	16.5 (61.7)	19.9 (67.8)	17.7 (63.9)	11.0 (51.8)	2.0 (35.6)	−10.9 (12.4)	−20.9 (−5.6)	0.1 (32.2)
Mean daily minimum °C (°F)	−29.5 (−21.1)	−25.9 (−14.6)	−16.3 (2.7)	−3.7 (25.3)	3.2 (37.8)	9.2 (48.6)	13.7 (56.7)	11.8 (53.2)	4.3 (39.7)	−4.2 (24.4)	−17.1 (1.2)	−27.3 (−17.1)	−6.8 (19.7)
Average precipitation mm (inches)	6.0 (0.24)	5.6 (0.22)	13.4 (0.53)	28.8 (1.13)	61.1 (2.41)	101.7 (4.00)	148.0 (5.83)	124.8 (4.91)	61.7 (2.43)	29.7 (1.17)	14.0 (0.55)	10.7 (0.42)	605.5 (23.84)
Average precipitation days (≥ 0.1 mm)	8.7	5.9	7.6	9.5	13.4	16.7	17.1	16.5	13.2	9.3	9.3	9.8	137
Average snowy days	10.6	7.8	10.1	7.4	0.8	0	0	0	0.3	6.3	11.4	12.7	67.4
Average relative humidity (%)	72	67	62	56	61	76	81	84	76	66	71	75	71
Mean monthly sunshine hours	159.7	197.2	235.4	217.2	233.4	225.4	218.3	212.1	199.6	176.3	144.7	132.7	2,352
Percentage possible sunshine	58	68	63	53	49	47	45	48	53	53	53	52	54
Source: China Meteorological Administration
