= Interstate 220 =

Interstate 220 (I-220) is the designation for two Interstate Highways in the United States, both related to Interstate 20:

- Interstate 220 (Mississippi), a bypass of Jackson, Mississippi
- Interstate 220 (Louisiana), a loop in Shreveport, Louisiana
