= Tangwanghe District =

Coordinates: 48°27′17″N 129°34′16″E

Tangwanghe District 汤旺河区
- District
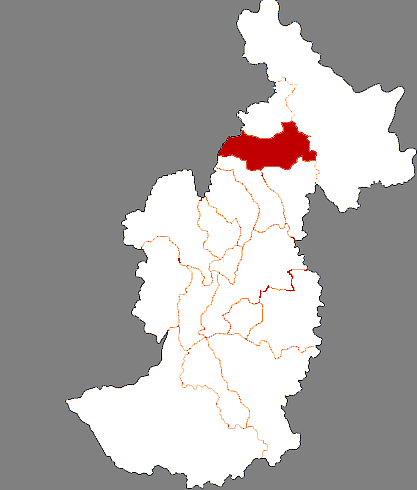
- Location of Tangwanghe District in Yichun

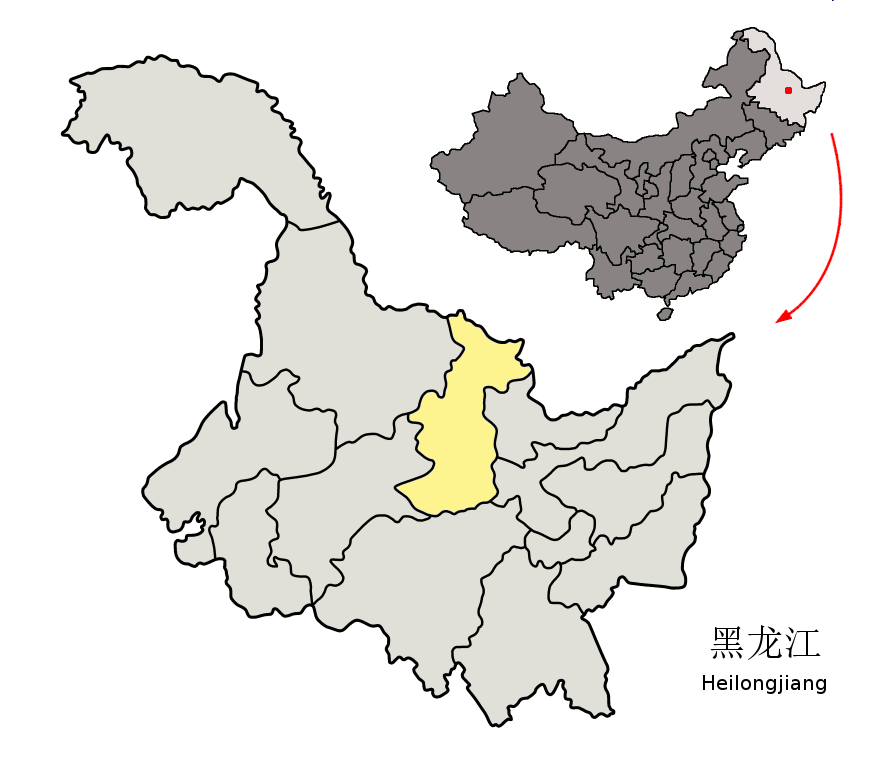
- Yichun in Heilongjiang
- Country: People's Republic of China
- Province: Heilongjiang
- Prefecture-level city: Yichun
- District seat: Tangwanghe Street (汤旺河街)

Area
  - Total: 2,153.51 km^{2} (831.47 sq mi)

Population (2008)
  - Total: 37,000
  - Density: 17/km^{2} (44/sq mi)
- Time zone: UTC+8 (China Standard)
- Postal code: 153037
- Website: twh.gov.cn

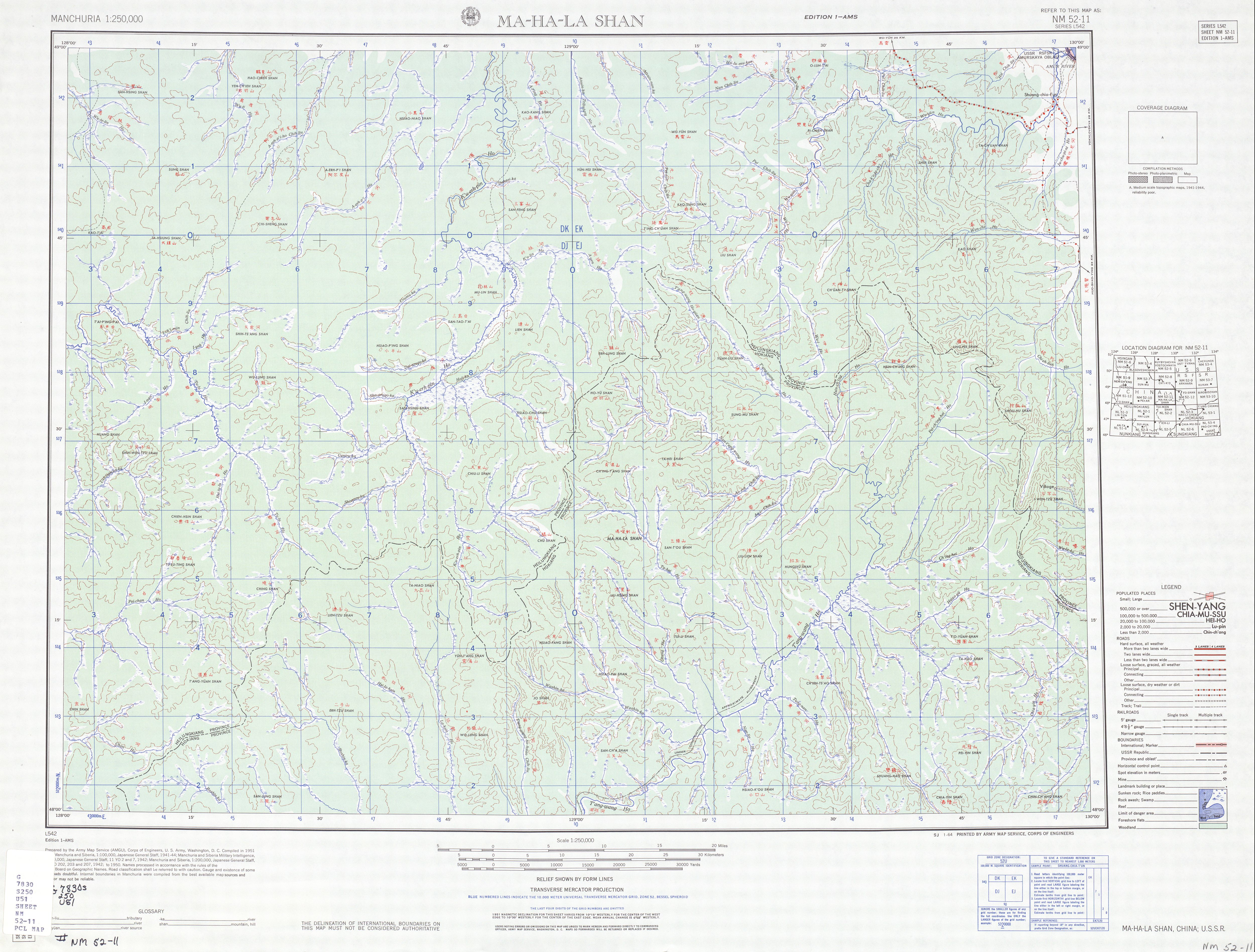
Mahalashan (labelled as MA-HA-LA SHAN 瑪哈剌山) (1951)

Tangwanghe (simplified Chinese: 汤旺河区; traditional Chinese: 湯旺河區; pinyin: Tāngwànghé Qū) is a district of the prefecture-level city of Yichun, Heilongjiang province, China.
