= Utah State Route 220 =

Utah State Route 220 may refer to:

- Utah State Route 220 (1941-1957)
- Utah State Route 220 (1966-1990)
