= Xilin District =

Coordinates: 47°28′50″N 129°18′41″E

Xilin District 西林区
- District
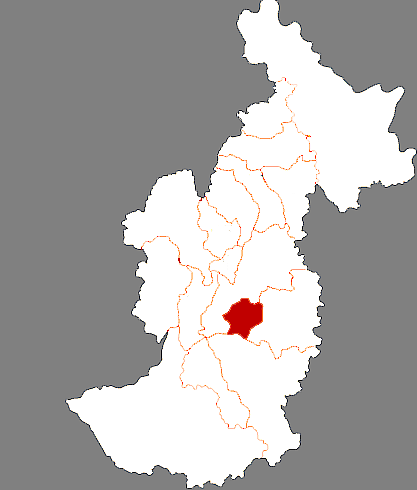
- Location of Xilin District in Yichun

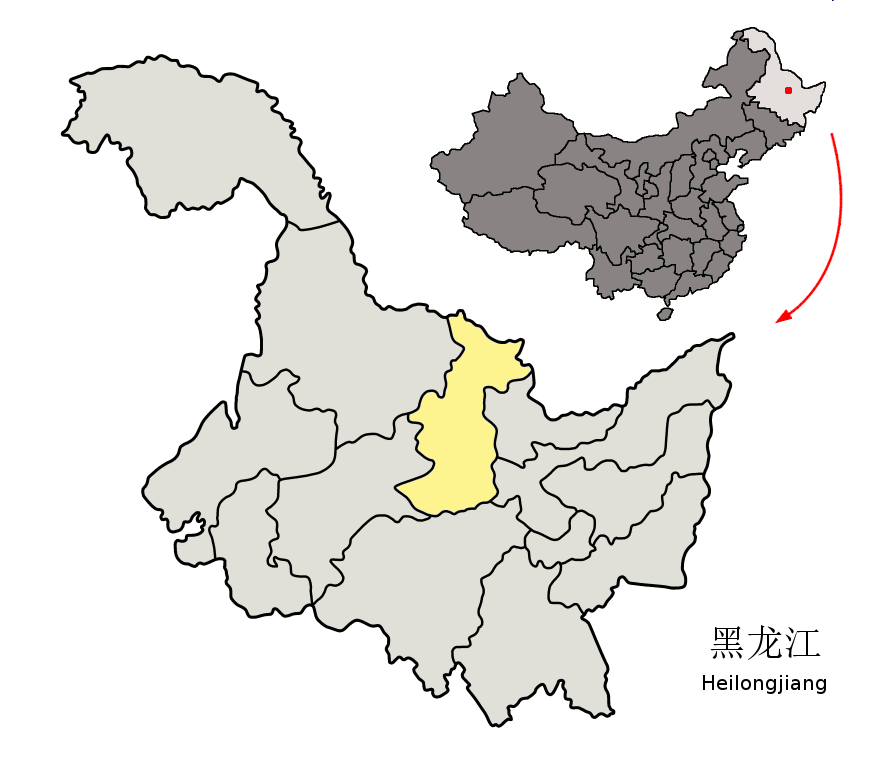
- Yichun in Heilongjiang
- Country: People's Republic of China
- Province: Heilongjiang
- Prefecture-level city: Yichun
- District seat: Xilin Subdistrict (西林街道)

Area
  - Total: 457 km^{2} (176 sq mi)

Population (2016)
  - Total: 43,814
  - Density: 95.9/km^{2} (248/sq mi)
- Time zone: UTC+8 (China Standard)
- Postal code: 153000
- Website: xilin.gov.cn

Xilin District (Chinese: 西林区; pinyin: Xīlín Qū) is a district of the prefecture-level city of Yichun, Heilongjiang province, China.
