= Utah State Route 221 =

Utah State Route 221 may refer to:

- Utah State Route 221 (1941-1964)
- Utah State Route 221 (1964-1969)
