= Yichun District =

Coordinates: 47°43′41″N 128°54′27″E

Yichun District 伊春区
- District
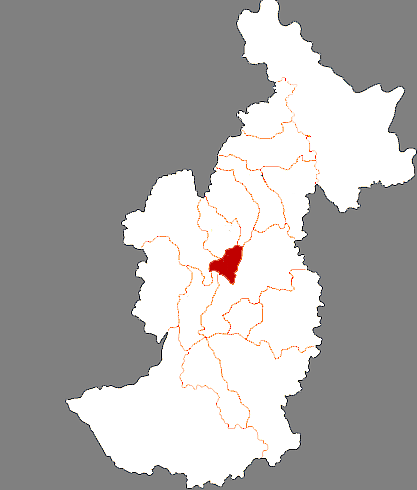
- Location of Yichun District in Yichun

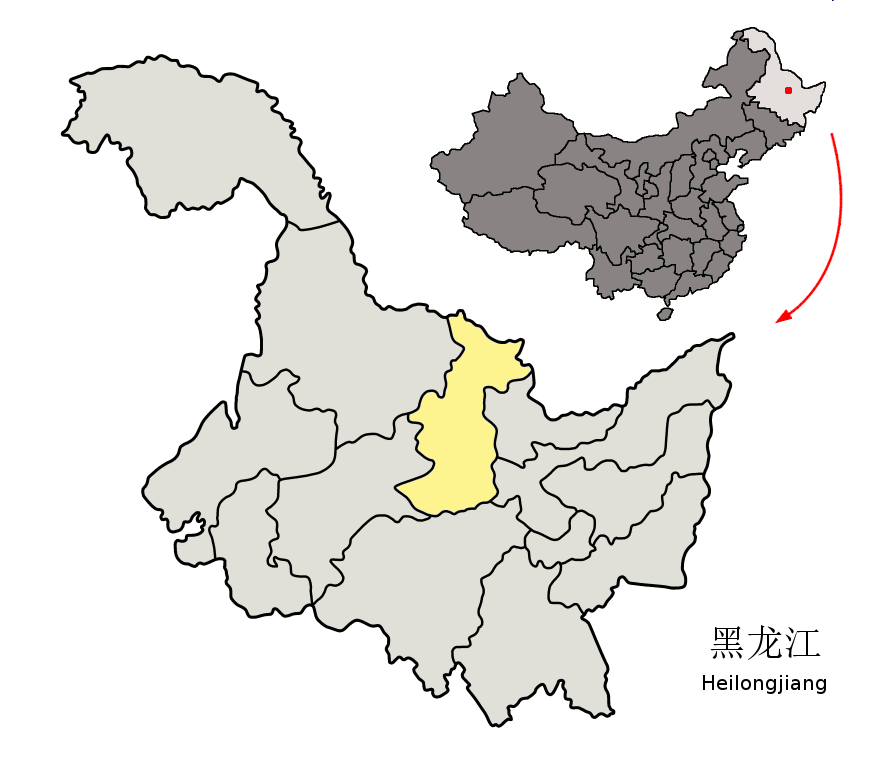
- Yichun in Heilongjiang
- Country: People's Republic of China
- Province: Heilongjiang
- Prefecture-level city: Yichun
- District seat: No.86, Middle Xinxing Road (新兴中路86号)

Area
  - Total: 90 km^{2} (35 sq mi)

Population (2012)
  - Total: 150,000
  - Density: 1,700/km^{2} (4,300/sq mi)
- Time zone: UTC+8 (China Standard)
- Postal code: 153000
- Website: www.ycycq.gov.cn

Yichun District (Chinese: 伊春区; pinyin: Yīchūn Qū) was a district of the prefecture-level city of Yichun, Heilongjiang province, China.
