= Jinshantun District =

Jinshantun 金山屯区
- District
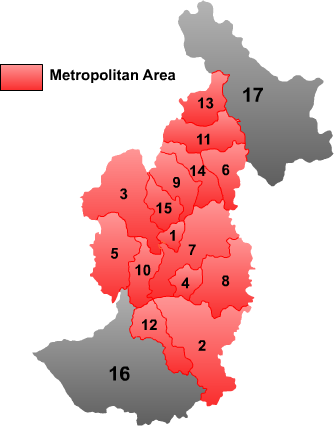
- Location of Jinshantun ("8") within Yichun City

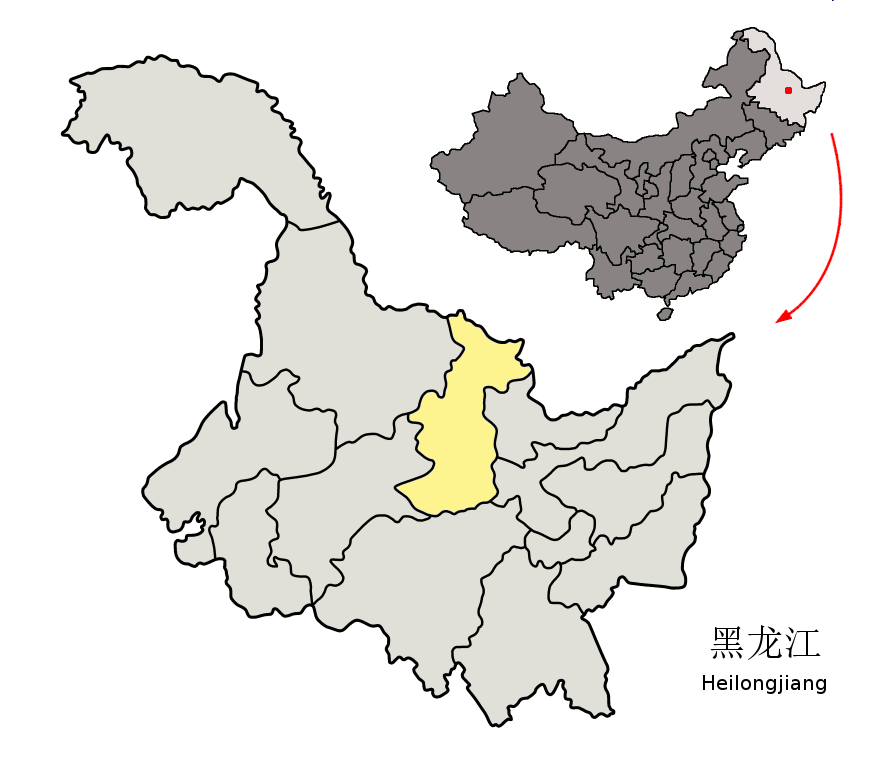
- Location of Yichun City in Heilongjiang
- Coordinates: 47°24′46″N 129°25′44″E
- Country: People's Republic of China
- Province: Heilongjiang
- Prefecture-level city: Yichun

Area
  - Total: 1,850 km^{2} (710 sq mi)

Population (2003)
  - Total: 50,000
  - Density: 27/km^{2} (70/sq mi)
- Time zone: UTC+8 (China Standard)

Jinshantun District (simplified Chinese: 金山屯区; traditional Chinese: 金山屯區; pinyin: Jīnshāntún Qū) is a district of the city of Yichun, Heilongjiang, People's Republic of China.
