= Shangganling District =

Coordinates: 47°58′29″N 129°01′27″E

Shangganling District 上甘岭区
- District
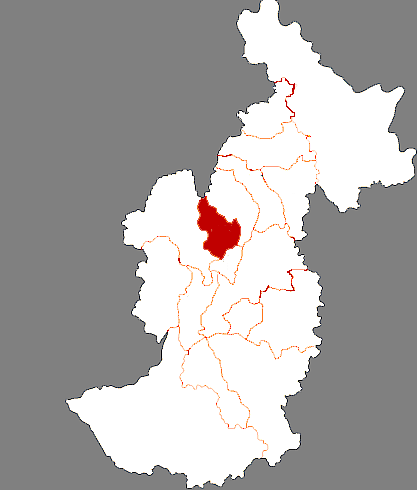
- Location of Shangganling District in Yichun

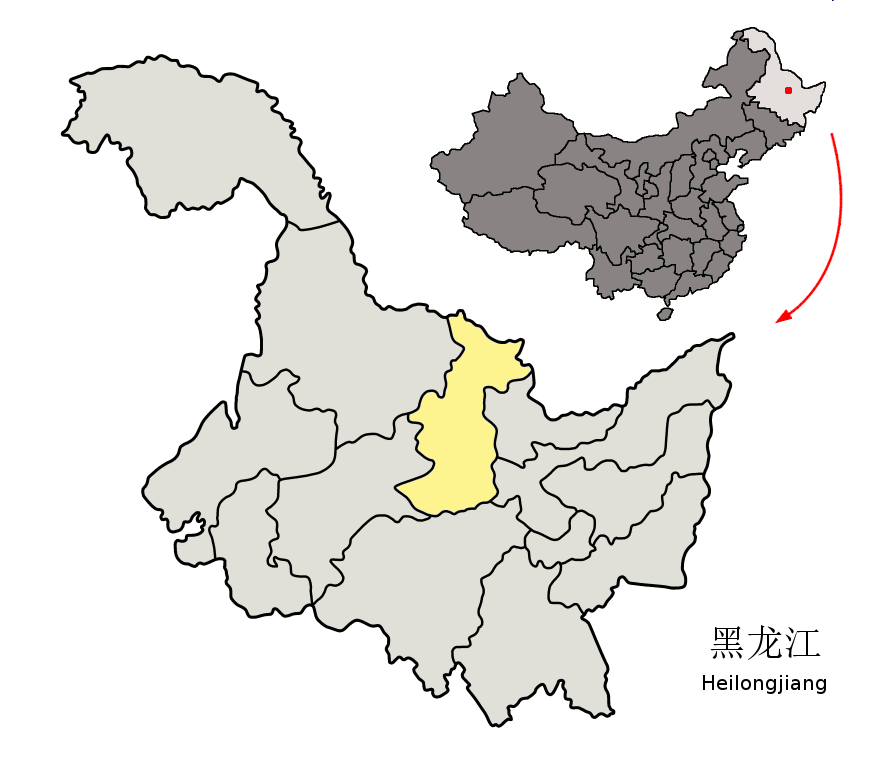
- Yichun in Heilongjiang
- Country: People's Republic of China
- Province: Heilongjiang
- Prefecture-level city: Yichun
- District seat: No.63, Shangganling Street (上甘岭大街63号)

Area
  - Total: 1,448.8 km^{2} (559.4 sq mi)

Population (2010)
  - Total: 22,000
  - Density: 15/km^{2} (39/sq mi)
- Time zone: UTC+8 (China Standard)
- Postal code: 153000
- Website: ycsgl.gov.cn

Shangganling (Chinese: 上甘岭区; pinyin: Shànggānlǐng Qū) is a district of the prefecture-level city of Yichun in Heilongjiang Province, China. It is named after Battle of Triangle Hill (Sanggamryong).
