= Meixi District =

Meixi 美溪区
- District
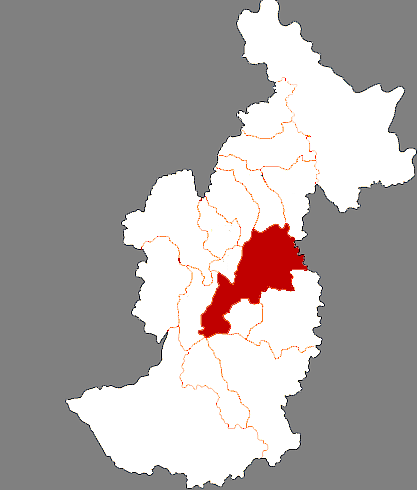
- Meixi in Yichun

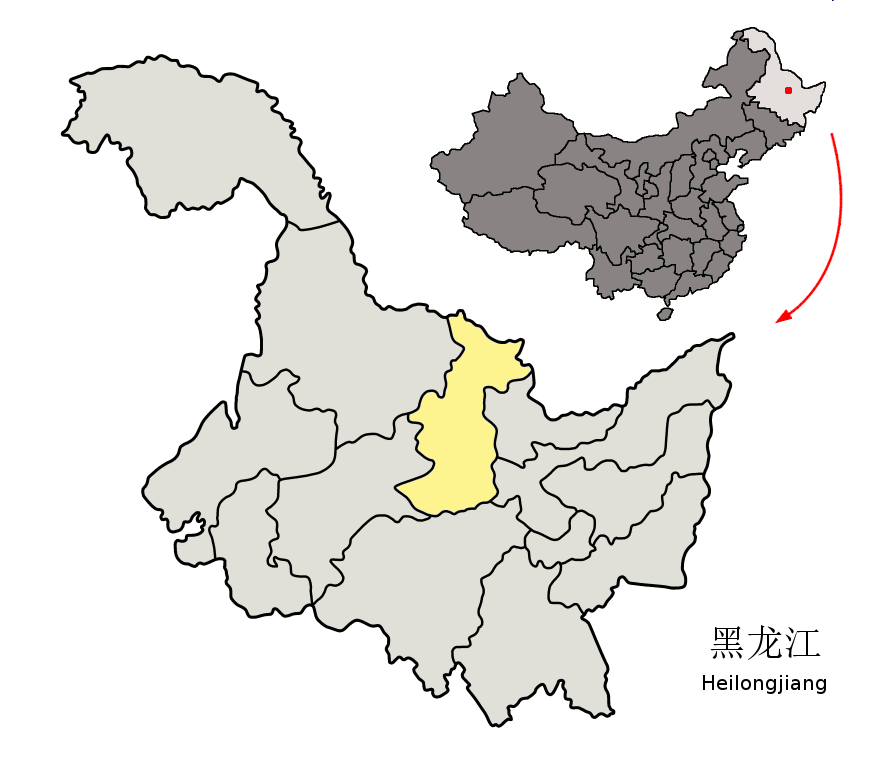
- Location of Yichun City in Heilongjiang
- Coordinates: 47°38′06″N 129°07′44″E
- Country: People's Republic of China
- Province: Heilongjiang
- Prefecture-level city: Yichun

Area
  - Total: 2,259 km^{2} (872 sq mi)

Population (2003)
  - Total: 50,000
  - Density: 22/km^{2} (57/sq mi)
- Time zone: UTC+8 (China Standard)

Meixi District
- Traditional Chinese: 美溪區
- Simplified Chinese: 美溪区
Transcriptions
Standard Mandarin
- Hanyu Pinyin: Měixī Qū

Meixi District was a district of the city of Yichun in Heilongjiang Province in the People's Republic of China.
