= Wuying District =

Coordinates: 48°06′29″N 129°14′42″E

Wuying District 五营区
- District
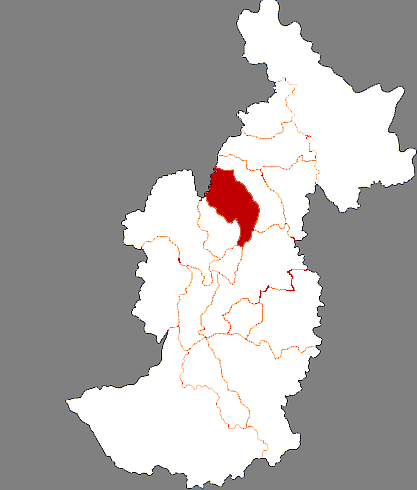
- Location of Wuying District in Yichun

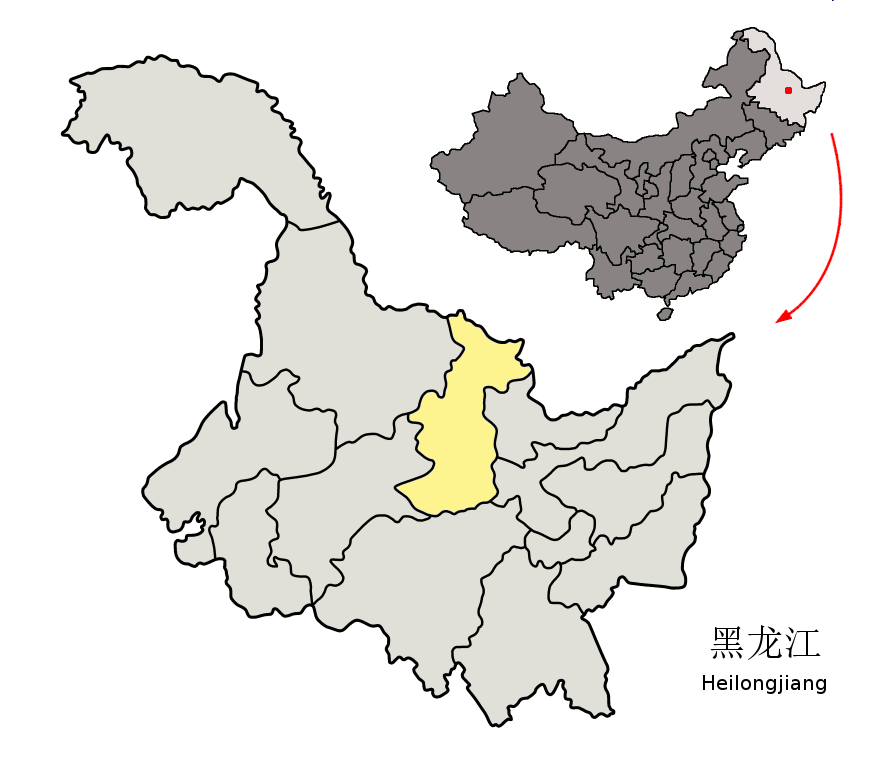
- Yichun in Heilongjiang
- Country: People's Republic of China
- Province: Heilongjiang
- Prefecture-level city: Yichun
- District seat: No.151, Central Street (中心大街151号)

Area
  - Total: 1,470 km^{2} (570 sq mi)

Population (2012)
  - Total: 45,000
  - Density: 31/km^{2} (79/sq mi)
- Time zone: UTC+8 (China Standard)
- Postal code: 153033
- Website: ycwy.gov.cn

Wuying District (simplified Chinese: 五营区; traditional Chinese: 五營區; pinyin: Wǔyíng Qū) is a district of the prefecture-level city of Yichun, Heilongjiang province, China.

== Climate ==
Climate data for Wuying, elevation 300 m (980 ft), (1991–2020 normals)
| Month | Jan | Feb | Mar | Apr | May | Jun | Jul | Aug | Sep | Oct | Nov | Dec | Year |
|---|---|---|---|---|---|---|---|---|---|---|---|---|---|
| Mean daily maximum °C (°F) | −13.8 (7.2) | −7.5 (18.5) | 0.7 (33.3) | 11.0 (51.8) | 19.2 (66.6) | 24.0 (75.2) | 26.8 (80.2) | 24.9 (76.8) | 19.2 (66.6) | 9.8 (49.6) | −3.3 (26.1) | −13.2 (8.2) | 8.1 (46.7) |
| Daily mean °C (°F) | −22.2 (−8.0) | −16.9 (1.6) | −7.1 (19.2) | 4.1 (39.4) | 11.8 (53.2) | 17.3 (63.1) | 20.7 (69.3) | 18.6 (65.5) | 11.7 (53.1) | 2.7 (36.9) | −9.9 (14.2) | −20.3 (−4.5) | 0.9 (33.6) |
| Mean daily minimum °C (°F) | −29.1 (−20.4) | −25.5 (−13.9) | −15.3 (4.5) | −3.2 (26.2) | 3.9 (39.0) | 10.7 (51.3) | 15.2 (59.4) | 13.4 (56.1) | 5.3 (41.5) | −3.4 (25.9) | −15.9 (3.4) | −26.4 (−15.5) | −5.9 (21.5) |
| Average precipitation mm (inches) | 6.3 (0.25) | 6.8 (0.27) | 13.8 (0.54) | 30.4 (1.20) | 63.4 (2.50) | 105.6 (4.16) | 153.0 (6.02) | 132.4 (5.21) | 70.4 (2.77) | 30.0 (1.18) | 15.6 (0.61) | 10.6 (0.42) | 638.3 (25.13) |
| Average precipitation days (≥ 0.1 mm) | 10.3 | 7.0 | 8.5 | 9.0 | 13.4 | 16.3 | 16.5 | 16.8 | 13.0 | 9.3 | 10.3 | 12.0 | 142.4 |
| Average snowy days | 13.3 | 10.0 | 11.3 | 6.8 | 0.6 | 0.1 | 0 | 0 | 0.2 | 5.8 | 12.7 | 15.3 | 76.1 |
| Average relative humidity (%) | 71 | 65 | 60 | 56 | 61 | 75 | 80 | 82 | 77 | 67 | 69 | 73 | 70 |
| Mean monthly sunshine hours | 144.6 | 179.0 | 217.0 | 208.4 | 224.5 | 212.3 | 209.9 | 197.1 | 189.3 | 171.8 | 143.4 | 127.4 | 2,224.7 |
| Percentage possible sunshine | 53 | 62 | 59 | 51 | 48 | 44 | 44 | 45 | 51 | 52 | 52 | 49 | 51 |
Source: China Meteorological Administration
