= Cuiluan District =

Cuiluan 翠峦区
- District
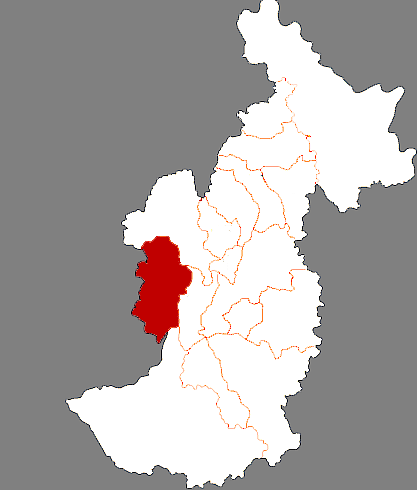
- Location of Cuiluan District in Yichun

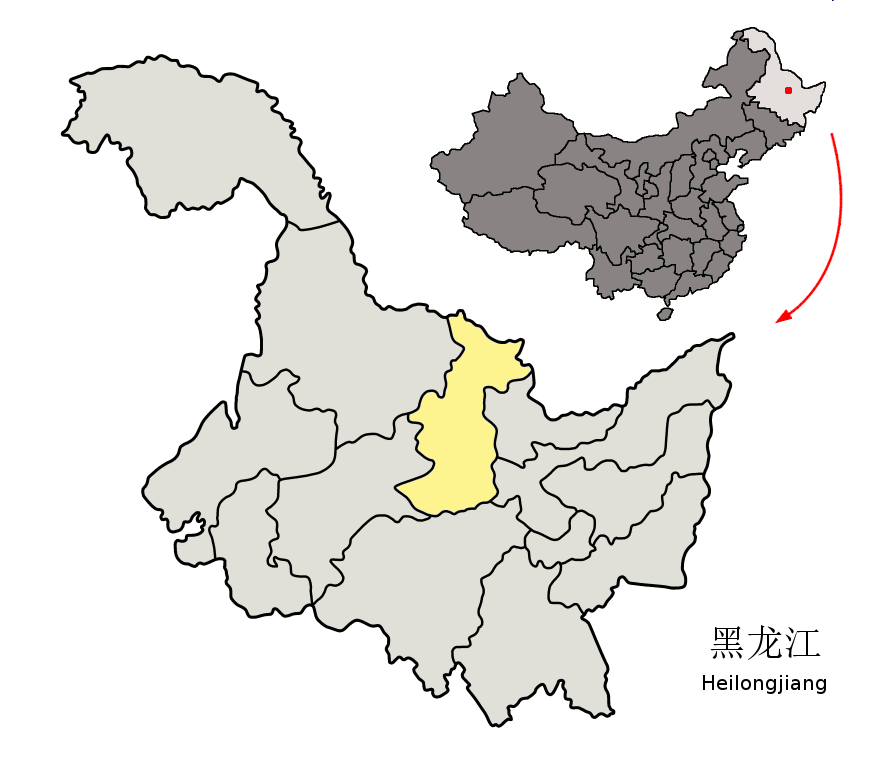
- Yichun in Heilongjiang

- Location in Heilongjiang
- Coordinates: 47.727°N 128.670°E
- Country: People's Republic of China
- Province: Heilongjiang
- Prefecture-level city: Yichun
- District seat: Xiangyang Subdistrict (向阳街道)

Area
  - Total: 1,560 km^{2} (600 sq mi)
- Elevation: 253 m (830 ft)

Population (2010)
  - Total: 44,960
  - Density: 28.8/km^{2} (74.6/sq mi)
- Time zone: UTC+8 (China Standard)
- Postal code: 153013
- Area code: 0458
- Website: cuiluan.gov.cn

Cuiluan District (simplified Chinese: 翠峦区; traditional Chinese: 翠巒區; pinyin: Cuìluán Qū) is a district in the west of Yichun, Heilongjiang province, People's Republic of China.

== Administrative divisions ==
There are two subdistricts in the district:

Subdistricts:

- Xiangyang Subdistrict (向阳街道), Shuguang Subdistrict (曙光街道)

== Transport ==
- G1111 Hegang–Harbin Expressway
- China National Highway 222
