= Xinqing District =

Coordinates: 48°17′26″N 129°32′01″E

Xinqing District 新青区
- District
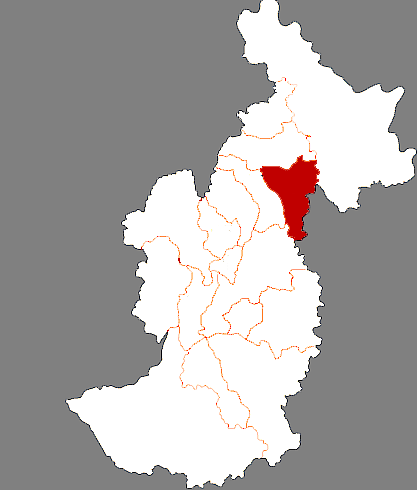
- Location of Xinqing District in Yichun

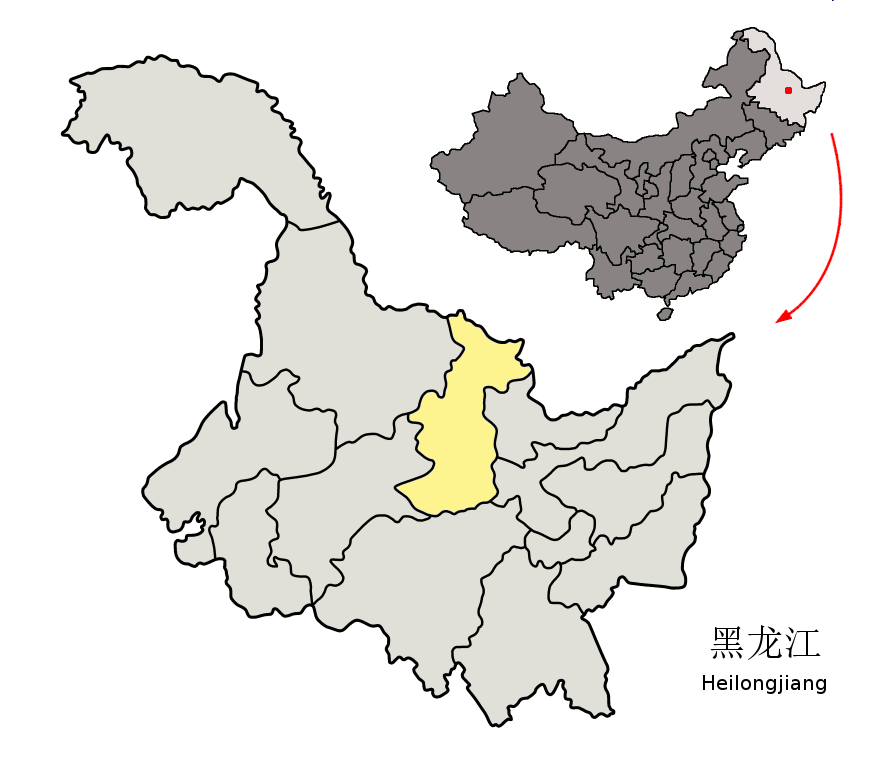
- Yichun in Heilongjiang
- Country: People's Republic of China
- Province: Heilongjiang
- Prefecture-level city: Yichun
- District seat: Guangming Street No.1 (光明大街1号)

Area
  - Total: 1,048.72 km^{2} (404.91 sq mi)

Population (2014)
  - Total: 47,000
  - Density: 45/km^{2} (120/sq mi)
- Time zone: UTC+8 (China Standard)
- Postal code: 153036
- Website: ycxq.gov.cn

Xinqing (Chinese: 新青; pinyin: Xīnqīng) is a district of the prefecture-level city of Yichun in Heilongjiang Province, China.
