= Yichun, Heilongjiang =

Yichun 伊春市 I-ch'un
- Prefecture-level city
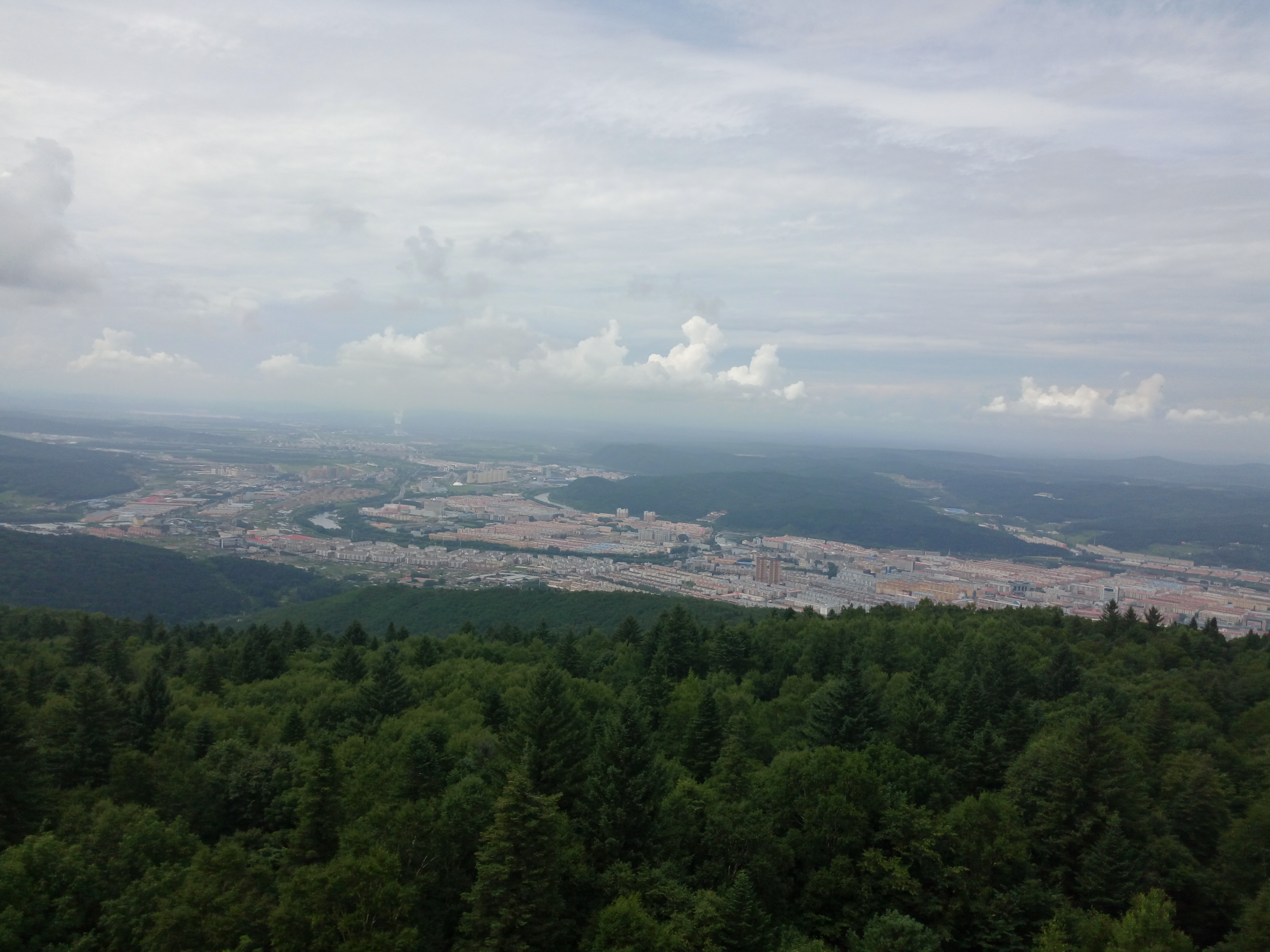
- Overview of Yimei, Yichun
- Nickname: Forest capital (林都)
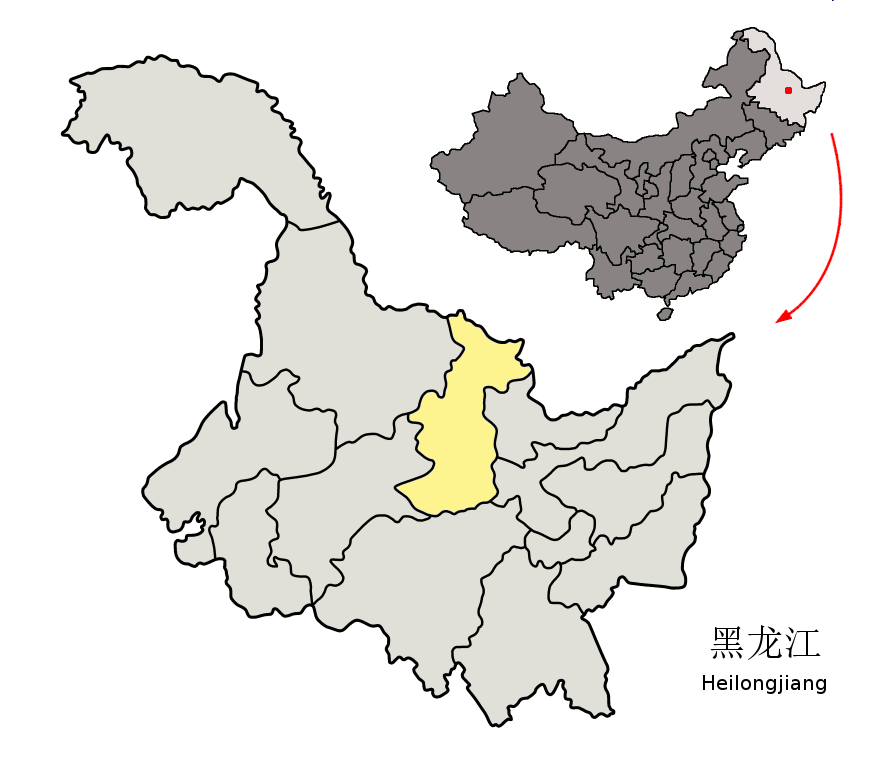
- Location of Yichun City (yellow) in Heilongjiang (light grey) and China

- Location of the city centre in Heilongjiang
- Coordinates (Yichun municipal government): 47°43′41″N 128°50′28″E
- Country: People's Republic of China
- Province: Heilongjiang
- County-level divisions: 17
- Established: 1958
- Municipal seat: Yimei District

Government
  - Type: Prefecture-level city
  - CPC Yichun Secretary: Wang Aiwen (王爱文)
  - Mayor: Gao Huan (高环)

Area
  - Prefecture-level city: 39,017 km^{2} (15,065 sq mi)

Population (2010)
  - Prefecture-level city: 1,148,126
  - Urban: 598,000
  - Metro: 729,202

GDP
  - Prefecture-level city: CN¥ 24.8 billion US$ 4.0 billion
  - Per capita: CN¥ 20,335; US$ 3,265
- Time zone: UTC+8 (China standard time)
- ZIP code: 153000
- Area code: 0458
- ISO 3166 code: CN-HL-07
- Licence plates: 黑F
- Climate: Dwb
- Website: yc.gov.cn

Yichun
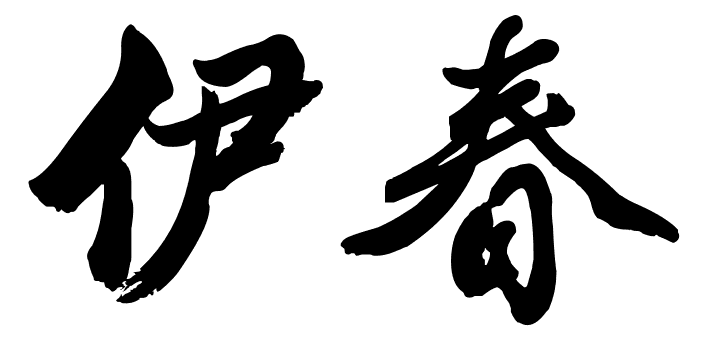
- "Yichun", as written in Chinese calligraphy

Chinese name
- Chinese: 伊春
- Postal: Ichun
Transcriptions
Standard Mandarin
- Hanyu Pinyin: Yīchūn
- Wade–Giles: I^{1}-ch'un^{1}

Manchu name
- Manchu script: ᡳᡧᡠᠨ
- Romanization: Išun

Russian name
- Russian: Ичунь

Yichun (Chinese: 伊春; pinyin: Yīchūn) is a prefecture-level city on the Songhua river in Heilongjiang province, China. The city is separated from Russia by the Amur River and has an international border of 246 kilometres (153 mi). According to the 2010 census, it had a total population of 1,148,126 with 729,202 people living in 15 districts separated by forests.据According to the statistics of the public security department, the total registered population of the city by the end of 2024 will be 1.033 million. Among them, the urban population is 900.000 and the rural population is 133,000. The urbanization rate of the registered population is 87.1%. The greening rate of Yichun is up to 83%. The nickname of Yichun is Lindu (Chinese: 林都; pinyin: Líndū; lit. 'forest capital').

== History ==
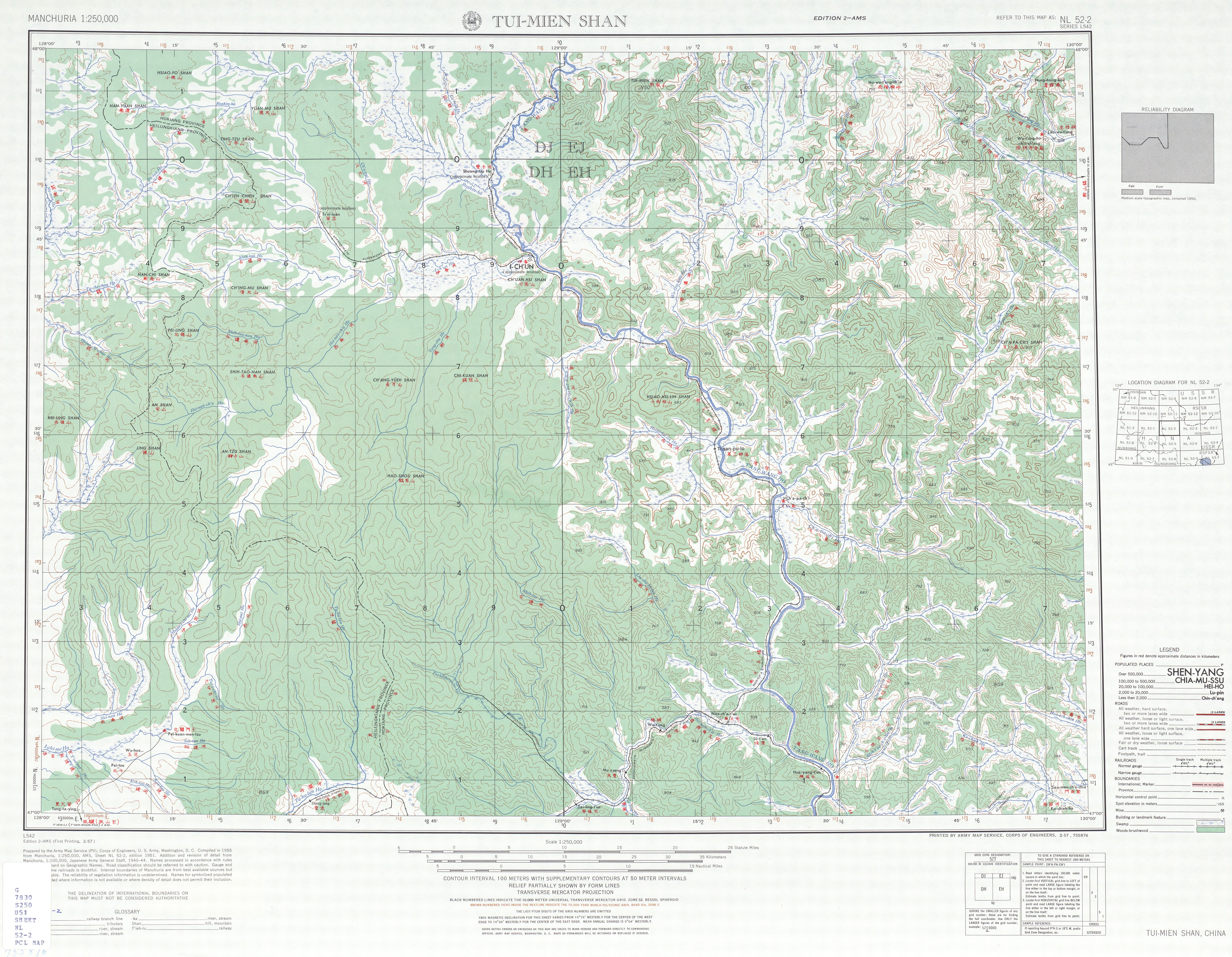
Map including Yichun (labeled as 伊春 I-CH'UN) (AMS, 1955)

Yichun was named after the Yichun River (伊春河), which is a small tributary of Tangwang River (汤旺河). The word Yichun means "nine" in Mongolian language. During the Shang dynasty Yichun was populated by the Sushen (肃慎). Before the Tang dynasty, the region was inhabited by several nomad tribes in the northeastern border area of China including Sushen and Donghu. During the Qing dynasty, Yichun was under the administration of Qiqihar and Hulan's Deputy Lieutenant-General (Fudutong) before it became a minor town under Tangyuan County's jurisdiction in the 1890s.

The region's real development began after the establishment of Manchukuo after Japanese force seized Manchuria in 1932. In November 1941, a railway from Suihua to Jiamusi was built before its branch was extended to today's Yichun district from Nancha in July 1942. In 1945, Yichun was established as Yichunjie (Yichun Street) under Tangyuan County's control. As a major center of lumber industry, Yichun has grown at an astonishing rate since 1949. In 1952 Yichun County was established by the PRC Government. On 13 Feb 1958 Yichun was designated a Prefecture-level city. However, in order to set up a pilot of the combination of enterprise management and government, The CPC Central Committee and State Council approved to establish Yichun Special District (伊春特区) instead of Yichun City in 1964. In 1979 the City of Yichun was reinstated. Jiayin and Tieli were put into Yichun's jurisdiction.

== Geography ==
Yichun is located in the northeast part of Heilongjiang with a border length of 2,495 km (1,550 mi), part of which faces Russia across the Amur River. The Lesser Khingan Mountains cross the city. The total administrative area is 33,000 km^{2} (13,000 sq mi). The channels and valleys are densely covered with trees and grasslands. There are 702 rivers, all of which are in the Amur and Songhua River drainage basins; the total water pondage is 10.2 billion cubic metres (360 billion cubic feet). The Tangwanghe River is the main river.

=== Climate ===
Yichun has a monsoon-influenced, hemiboreal climate (Köppen Dwb), with long, bitterly cold, but very dry winters, and very warm, humid summers. With an annual mean temperature of 1.8 °C (35.2 °F), it is among the coldest Chinese cities, and diurnal temperature variation tends to be large, especially in winter and spring. The monthly 24-hour average temperature ranges from −20.9 °C (−5.6 °F) in January to 21.1 °C (70.0 °F). During the warmer months, rainfall is somewhat enhanced by the mountainous topography, allowing for a generous annual precipitation total of 664.5 millimetres (26.2 in). However, the monsoon still means that more than 60% of the annual precipitation falls from June to August alone.

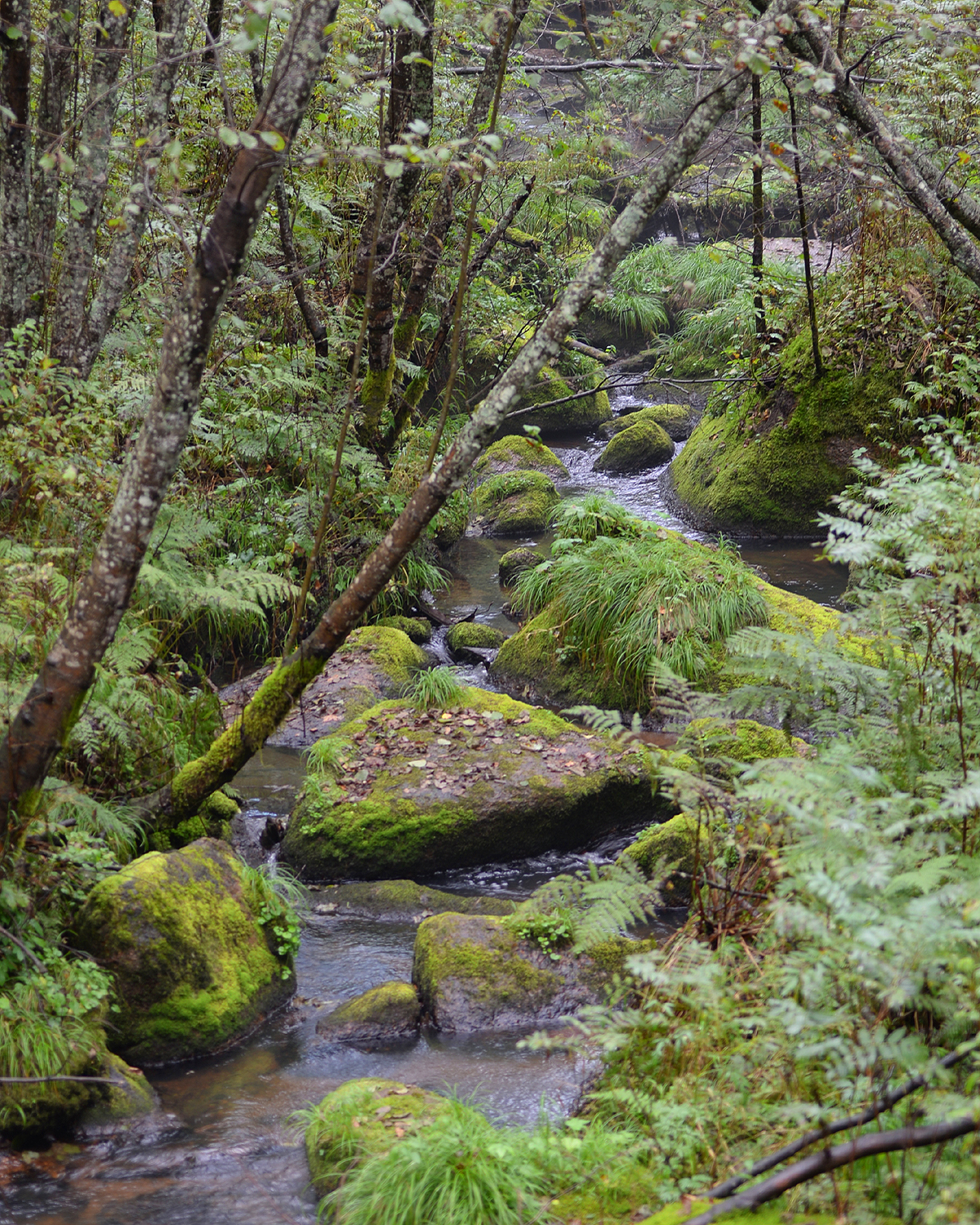
Xiangshui Creek, Wuying National Forest Park, Heilongjiang, China (6 September 2016)

Climate data for Yichun, elevation 265 m (869 ft), (1991–2020 normals, extremes 1955–present)
Month	Jan	Feb	Mar	Apr	May	Jun	Jul	Aug	Sep	Oct	Nov	Dec	Year
Record high °C (°F)	2.3 (36.1)	8.5 (47.3)	18.7 (65.7)	28.9 (84.0)	34.0 (93.2)	38.2 (100.8)	36.3 (97.3)	35.4 (95.7)	30.8 (87.4)	27.8 (82.0)	14.1 (57.4)	6.3 (43.3)	38.2 (100.8)
Mean daily maximum °C (°F)	−13.3 (8.1)	−7.0 (19.4)	1.3 (34.3)	11.7 (53.1)	19.8 (67.6)	24.5 (76.1)	27.1 (80.8)	25.2 (77.4)	19.7 (67.5)	10.5 (50.9)	−2.5 (27.5)	−12.7 (9.1)	8.7 (47.7)
Daily mean °C (°F)	−20.9 (−5.6)	−15.5 (4.1)	−5.7 (21.7)	5.0 (41.0)	12.5 (54.5)	17.8 (64.0)	21.1 (70.0)	19.1 (66.4)	12.4 (54.3)	3.8 (38.8)	−8.6 (16.5)	−19.0 (−2.2)	1.8 (35.3)
Mean daily minimum °C (°F)	−27.5 (−17.5)	−23.4 (−10.1)	−13.0 (8.6)	−1.7 (28.9)	5.1 (41.2)	11.6 (52.9)	15.9 (60.6)	14.2 (57.6)	6.5 (43.7)	−2.0 (28.4)	−14.2 (6.4)	−24.7 (−12.5)	−4.4 (24.0)
Record low °C (°F)	−43.1 (−45.6)	−41.2 (−42.2)	−37.9 (−36.2)	−18.6 (−1.5)	−8.8 (16.2)	−0.5 (31.1)	4.5 (40.1)	0.4 (32.7)	−6.9 (19.6)	−22.5 (−8.5)	−36.3 (−33.3)	−40.4 (−40.7)	−43.1 (−45.6)
Average precipitation mm (inches)	6.1 (0.24)	6.5 (0.26)	14.4 (0.57)	26.8 (1.06)	56.5 (2.22)	125.7 (4.95)	161.8 (6.37)	137.0 (5.39)	72.1 (2.84)	32.4 (1.28)	14.5 (0.57)	10.7 (0.42)	664.5 (26.17)
Average precipitation days (≥ 0.1 mm)	8.7	5.8	7.8	9.1	13.0	15.4	15.5	15.4	11.6	8.9	8.6	10.4	130.2
Average snowy days	12.4	9.2	10.6	5.4	0.2	0	0	0	0.1	4.5	10.9	13.9	67.2
Average relative humidity (%)	70	65	59	55	61	75	80	83	77	65	69	72	69
Mean monthly sunshine hours	154.9	192.0	234.8	221.2	240.2	223.3	218.2	203.5	198.7	178.2	149.5	130.0	2,344.5
Percentage possible sunshine	56	66	63	54	51	47	46	47	53	54	54	50	53
Source 1: China Meteorological AdministrationAll-time May Record
Source 2: Weather China

== Subdivisions ==
On 13 June 2019, the District division adjustment plan of Yichun, which plans to merge all of the original 15 districts to 4 districts and 4 counties was approved by the State Council.

Yichun, Heilongjiang currently comprises 4 districts, 1 county-level city and 5 counties.
Districts: Yimei, Wucui, Youhao and Jinlin
County-level city: Tieli
Counties: Tangwang, Fenglin, Nancha and Dajingshan

Name	Hanzi	Hanyu Pinyin	Population (2010 census)	Area (km^{2})	Density (/km^{2})	Former division
Yimei District	伊美区	Yīměi Qū	186,982	2,359	79.26	Yichun, Meixi
Wucui District	乌翠区	Wūcuì Qū	76,376	2,814	27.14	Wumahe, Cuiluan
Youhao District	友好区	Yǒuhǎo Qū	72,989	3,827	19.07	Youhao, Shangganling
Jinlin District	金林区	Jīnlín Qū	91,959	2,307	39.86	Jinshantun, Xilin
Tangwang County	汤旺县	Tāngwàng Xiàn	52,126	4,425	11.77	Tangwanghe, Wuyiling
Fenglin County	丰林县	Fēnglín Xiàn	98,894	5,263	18.79	Wuying, Hongxing, Xinqing
Nancha County	南岔县	Nánchà Xiàn	118,593	3,088	38.40	downgraded into a county
Daqingshan County	大箐山县	Dàqìngshān Xiàn	77,714	1,066.7	72.85	Dailing, and parts of Tieli (Langxiang town)
Jiayin County	嘉荫县	Jiāyīn Xiàn	68,579	7,273	9.42	no changes
Tieli city	铁力市	Tiělì Shì	303,914	6,593.3	46.09	ceded Langxiang town to Dajingshan

#	Name	Hanzi	Hanyu Pinyin	Population (2010 est.)	Area (km^{2})	Density (/km^{2})
1	Yichun District	伊春区	Yīchūn Qū	146,074	100	1,461
2	Nancha District	南岔区	Nánchà Qū	118,060	3,088	38
3	Youhao District	友好区	Yǒuhǎo Qū	53,409	2,366	23
4	Xilin District	西林区	Xīlín Qū	51,938	457	114
5	Cuiluan District	翠峦区	Cuìluán Qū	44,976	1,560	29
6	Xinqing District	新青区	Xīnqīng Qū	43,054	1,181	36
7	Meixi District	美溪区	Měixī Qū	40,697	2,259	18
8	Jinshantun District	金山屯区	Jīnshāntún Qū	39,917	1,850	22
9	Wuying District	五营区	Wǔyíng Qū	33,980	1,040	33
10	Wumahe District	乌马河区	Wūmǎhé Qū	31,391	1,254	25
11	Tangwanghe District	汤旺河区	Tāngwànghé Qū	30,980	1,263	25
12	Dailing District	带岭区	Dàilǐng Qū	32,256	1,040	31
13	Wuyiling District	乌伊岭区	Wūyīlǐng Qū	21,145	3,162	7
14	Hongxing District	红星区	Hóngxīng Qū	21,838	3,042	7
15	Shangganling District	上甘岭区	Shànggānlǐng Qū	19,487	1,461	13
16	Tieli City	铁力市	Tiělì Shì	350,358	6,620	53

== Economy ==
The city's GDP topped RMB 20.24 billion in 2010, featuring a growth of 15.7% over the previous year. In 2010, value-added industrial output generated by enterprises with designated size or above rose 29.3% to RMB 7.12 billion. In 2010, the foreign trade value of Yichun totaled US$302.23 million, up 36.3% year on year.

Wood processing and metallurgy are the main industries in Yichun. In 2010, value-added industrial output from wood processing increased 34% to RMB 2.01 billion, while that from metallurgy rose 39.2% to RMB 2.2 billion, accounting for 33.6% of the industrial sector's total. These two industries accounted for 91% of Yichun's total value-added industrial output according to the statistics in 2009.

== Transportation ==
Yichun Lindu Airport, located in a forest approximately 9 kilometres (5.6 mi) from downtown Yichun, is the city's airport. It started operations in August 2009, and is capable of serving 142,000 passengers a year. Yichun railway station operates daily trains to Harbin, the capital of Heilongjiang Province. Yichun West railway station opened as the terminus of the Harbin–Yichun high-speed railway in September 2026. The Yichun-Hegang Highway and the Yichun-Harbin Highway(part of Hegang-Harbin Highway) connect the city with other cities in Heilongjiang Province.
