= Wumahe District =

Coordinates: 47°43′37″N 128°48′00″E

Wumahe District 乌马河区
- District
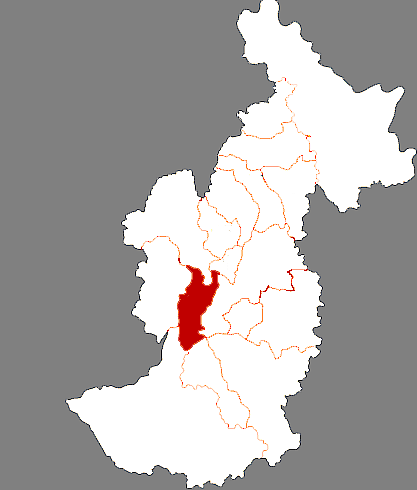
- Location of Wumahe District in Yichun

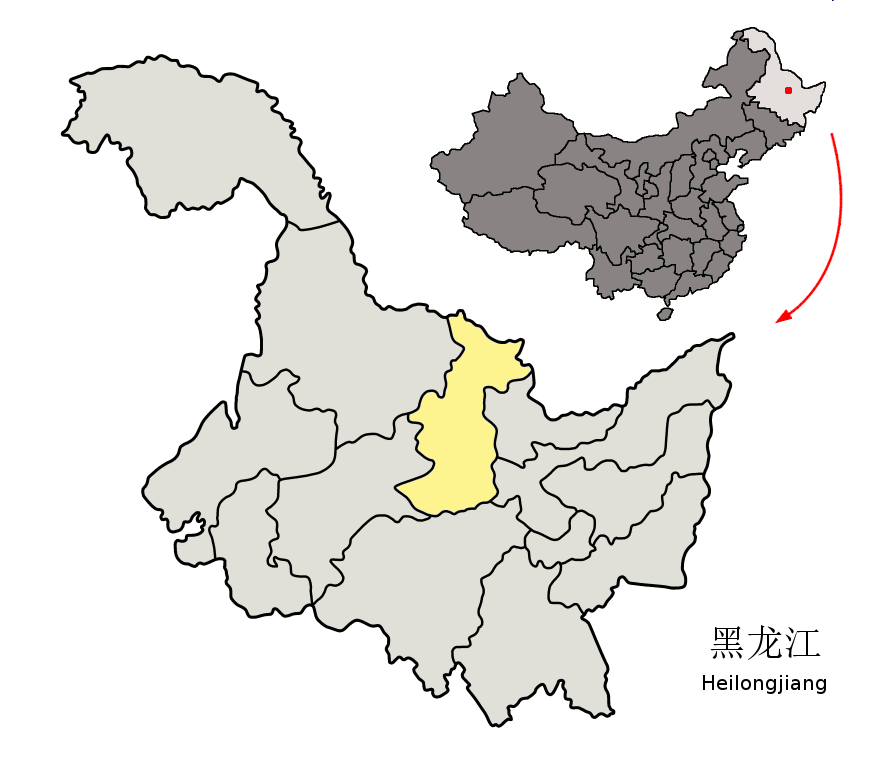
- Yichun in Heilongjiang
- Country: People's Republic of China
- Province: Heilongjiang
- Prefecture-level city: Yichun
- District seat: Lindu Avenue (林都大街)

Area
  - Total: 1,225.3 km^{2} (473.1 sq mi)

Population (2014)
  - Total: 37,000
  - Density: 30/km^{2} (78/sq mi)
- Time zone: UTC+8 (China Standard)
- Postal code: 153000
- Website: wumahe.gov.cn

Wumahe District (simplified Chinese: 乌马河区; traditional Chinese: 烏馬河區; pinyin: Wūmǎhé Qū) was a district of the prefecture-level city of Yichun, Heilongjiang province, China.
