= G1015 Tieli–Horqin Right Middle Banner Expressway =

Road in China

Tieli–Horqin Right Middle Banner Expressway
- 铁力－科右中旗高速公路
- Tieke Expressway 铁科高速公路

Route information
- Auxiliary route of G10

Major junctions
- West end: Horqin Right Middle Banner, Inner Mongolia
- East end: Tieli, Heilongjiang

Location
- Country: China

Highway system
- National Trunk Highway System; Primary; Auxiliary; National Highways; Transport in China
← G1013	→ G1016

The G1015 Tieli–Horqin Right Middle Banner Expressway (Chinese: 铁力—科尔沁右翼中旗高速公路), also referred to as the Tieke Expressway (Chinese: 铁科高速公路), is an under construction expressway in China that connects Tieli, Heilongjiang to Horqin Right Middle Banner, Inner Mongolia.

== Route ==
The expressway starts in Tieli, Heilongjiang, and passes through Tonghe County, Fangzheng County, Yanshou County, Shangzhi, Wuchang, Yushu, Fuyu, Songyuan, Qian'an County, and Tongyu County, before terminating in Horqin Right Middle Banner, Inner Mongolia.
