= Hulan (disambiguation) =

Hulan District, one of nine districts of the prefecture-level city of Harbin, the capital of Heilongjiang Province, Northeast China

It may also refer to:

== Places ==
- Hulan, Iran, a village in Qarah Su Rural District, in the Central District of Kermanshah County, Kermanshah Province, Iran
- Hulan River, a river in Heilongjiang Province, China

== People ==
Given name

- Hulan Jack (1906–1986), Saint Lucian-born American politician from New York, elected Borough President of Manhattan

Surname

- Bud Hulan (born 1944), Canadian academic, researcher and politician
- Liu Hulan (1932–1947), a young female spy during the Chinese Civil War between the Kuomintang and the Communist Party
- Luděk Hulan (1929–1979), Czech jazz double-bassist and musical organiser

== Other uses ==
- Liu Hulan (opera), 1954 Chinese-language western-style opera by Chen Zi based on the death of a 14-year-old communist party girl Liu Hulan
