= G1011 Harbin–Tongjiang Expressway =

Expressway in China

Harbin–Tongjiang Expressway
- 哈尔滨－同江高速公路
- Hatong Expressway 哈同高速公路

Route information
- Auxiliary route of G10
- Part of AH33
- Length: 556 km (345 mi)

Major junctions
- Southwest end: G1001 in Harbin, Heilongjiang
- Northeast end: G221 in Tongjiang, Jiamusi, Heilongjiang

Location
- Country: China

Highway system
- National Trunk Highway System; Primary; Auxiliary; National Highways; Transport in China
← G1001	→ G1012

Asian Highway 33

Major junctions
- West end: Harbin, China
- East end: Tongjiang, China

Location
- Countries: China

Highway system
- Asian Highway Network
← AH32	→ AH34

Hatong Expressway in Heilongjiang Province expressway network

The G1011 Harbin–Tongjiang Expressway (Chinese: 哈尔滨—同江高速公路), commonly referred to as the Hatong Expressway (Chinese: 哈同高速公路), is an expressway that connects the cities of Harbin, Heilongjiang, China, and Tongjiang, a county-level city in Jiamusi, Heilongjiang. It is completely in Heilongjiang Province.

Also, this expressway has the same route as Asian Highway Network AH33.

The expressway is a spur or auxiliary line of the G10 Suifenhe–Manzhouli Expressway. The Harbin–Tongjiang Expressway meets the Suifenhe–Manzhouli Expressway at Harbin.

The expressway passes through the cities of Harbin, Jiamusi, Shuangyashan, and ends at Tongjiang, which is a county-level city of Jiamusi.

== Detailed Itinerary ==
From West to East
Continues as Xianfeng Road; Harbin-Centre
	G221 Road; Tuanjie
Harbin-East Toll Station
Service Area
0 A-B (71 A-B)	G1001 Harbin Ring Expressway
Service Area
Harbin Metropolitan Area
28	G221 Road; Binxi-Feiketu Towards Changshou National Forest Park
52	G221 Road; Binxian Erlongshan Scenic Area
83	X004 Road; Chang'an
Baidu Service Area
103	G221 Road; Baidu-Shengli
149	G221 Road; Huifa
160	G221 Road; S203 Road; Fangzheng-West Huazishan Scenic Area
166	Tong'an Road; Fangzheng-Centre Fangzheng Yuanshi Forest
Demoli Service Area
200	G221 Road; S203 Road; Daluomi
	G221 Road; Dalianhe
Demoli Service Area
251	G221 Road; S308 Road; Yilan
	S20 Qiyi Expressway
	G221 Road; Hongkeli
	G221 Road; Yanjiang-Jiamusi
	G11 Heda Expressway; Jiamusi-Centre
	Anqing Road; Jiamusi-Changfa
	Simajia
Taiping Service Area
	Jixian
	G221 Road; S307 Road; Jixian-Shuangyashan
Jixian Service Area
	291 Farm
Jinshan Service Area
	G221 Road; Jinshan
	S205 Road; Fujin-West
	G221 Road; S306 Road; Fujin-Dayushu
	S11 Jianji Expressway
	G221 Road; S306 Road; Erlongshan
Tongjiang Service Area
Tongjiang Toll Station
Continues as G221 Road; Towards Tongjiang
Under Construction; Towards Tongjiang-Nizhneleninskoye railway bridge (Russia) AH33 R455 Highway
From West to East
