= Airports in Jiamusi =

Jiamusi Airport may refer to:

- Jiansanjiang Shidi Airport, located in Jiansanjiang
- Fuyuan Dongji Airport, located in Fuyuan
