= Dalian Airlines =

Chinese airline

Dalian Airlines 大连航空

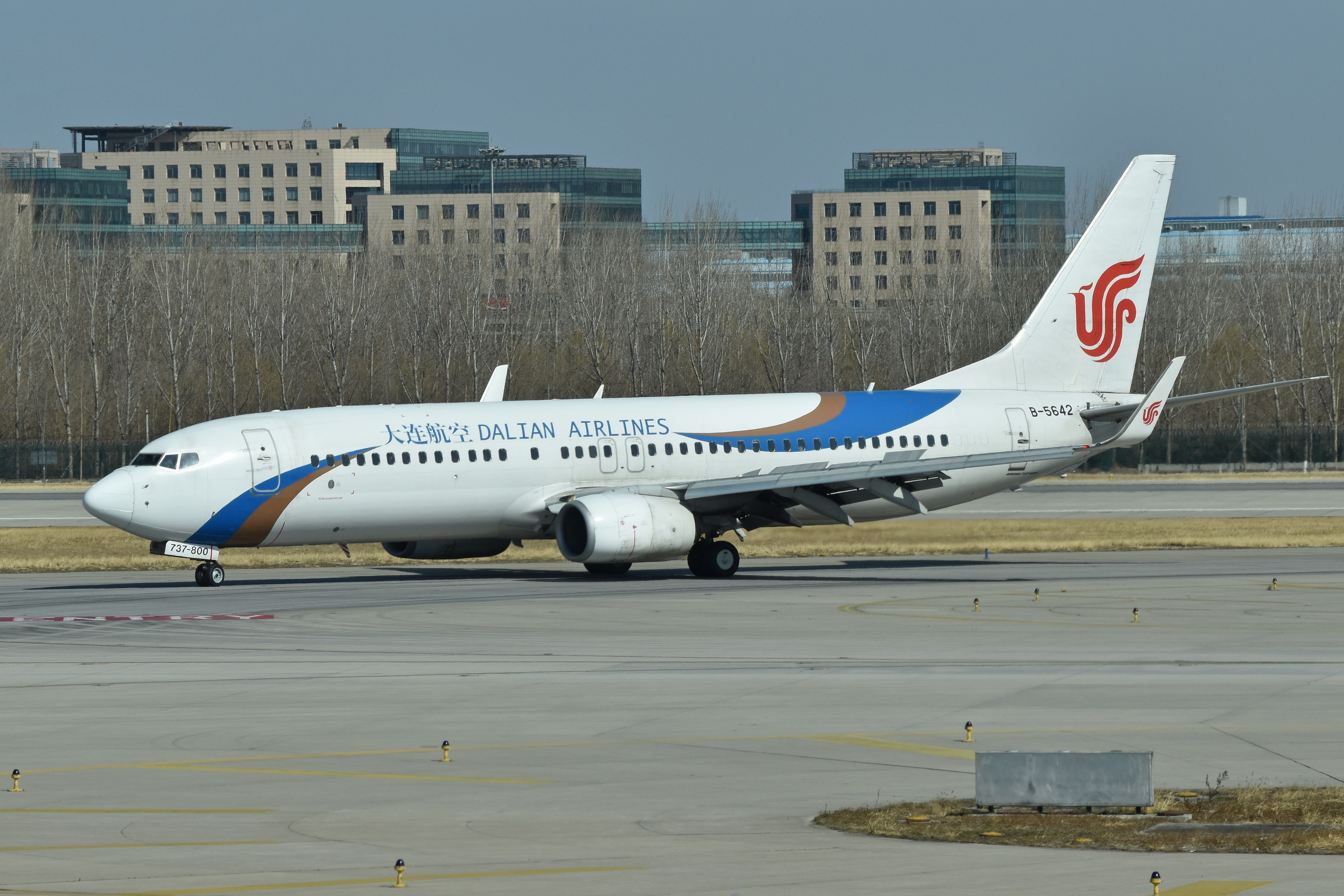
IATA	ICAO	Call sign
CA	CCD	XIANGJIAN
- Commenced operations: 31 December 2011; 14 years ago
- Hubs: Dalian Zhoushuizi International Airport
- Frequent-flyer program: Phoenix Miles
- Fleet size: 11 (As of October 2026)
- Destinations: 18
- Parent company: Air China (80%)
- Headquarters: Dalian, Liaoning, China
- Key people: Zhao Xiaohang (chairman)
- Website: www.dalianair-china.com

Dalian Airlines Co Ltd is an airline based at Dalian Zhoushuizi International Airport in Dalian, Liaoning, China. It is jointly owned by Air China, investing RMB 800 million in cash to hold an 80% stake in the new company, and Dalian Baoshui Zhengtong Co, investing RMB 200 million for the remaining 20%. Dalian Airlines provides both passenger and cargo services. The airline launched operations on 31 December 2011.

== History ==
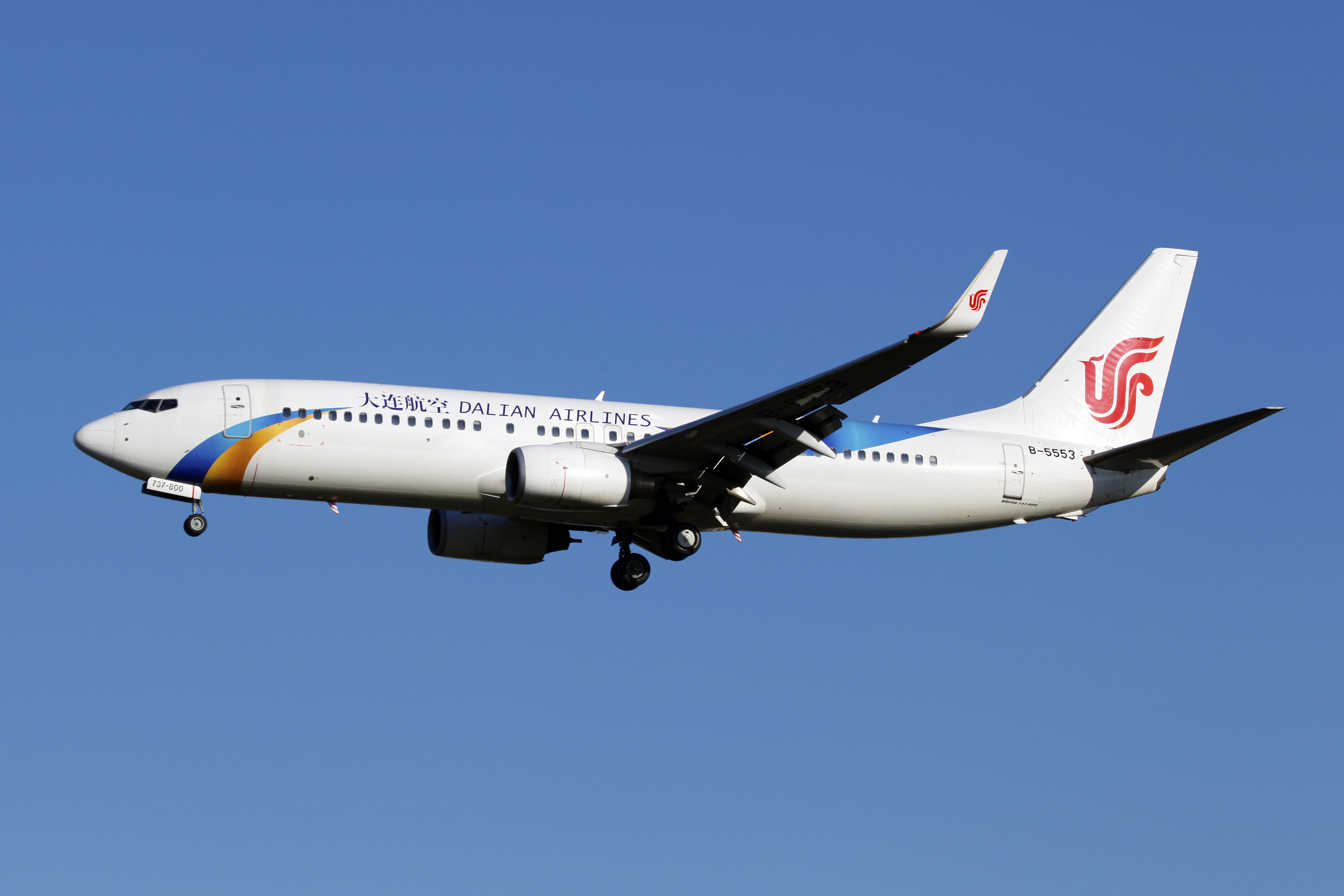
A Dalian Airlines Boeing 737-800

On 5 July 2011, CAAC, China's civil aviation regulator, granted Air China and Dalian Baoshui Zhengtong Co permission to establish Dalian Airlines Co Ltd. This follows an agreement reached between Air China and the Dalian government in 2010.

The government of Dalian had closed a similar deal with HNA Group, parent of Hainan Airlines, before. However, due to disagreement between the two parties, the deal was abandoned later, opening the door for Air China.

The airline has launched commercial operations effective 31 December 2011; its first flight was from Dalian to Shenzhen.

== Destinations ==
The airline will serve a domestic network linking its Dalian hub with all Chinese provincial capitals, coastal cities, and tourism destinations. Internationally, Dalian Airlines will operate flights to Japan and South Korea.

Current routes are listed below:

Country	City	Airport	Notes	Refs
China	Beijing	Beijing Capital International Airport		
China	Beijing	Beijing Daxing International Airport		
China	Changsha	Changsha Huanghua International Airport		
China	Dalian	Dalian Zhoushuizi International Airport	Hub	
China	Hangzhou	Hangzhou Xiaoshan International Airport		
China	Xi'an	Xi'an Xianyang International Airport		
China	Chengdu	Chengdu Shuangliu International Airport		
China	Chengdu	Chengdu Tianfu International Airport		
China	Guiyang	Guiyang Longdongbao International Airport		
China	Haikou	Haikou Meilan International Airport		
China	Jiansanjiang	Jiansanjiang Shidi Airport		
China	Jinan	Jinan Yaoqiang International Airport		
China	Kunming	Kunming Changshui International Airport		
China	Shanghai	Shanghai Pudong International Airport		
China	Shiyan	Shiyan Wudangshan Airport		
China	Yichang	Yichang Sanxia Airport		
China	Liuzhou	Liuzhou Bailian Airport		
China	Nanning	Nanning Wuxu International Airport		

== Fleet ==
As of August 2025, Dalian Airlines operates the following aircraft:

Dalian Airlines Fleet
Aircraft	In service	Passengers			Notes
Aircraft	In service	J	Y	Total	Notes
Boeing 737-800	2	12	147	159	
Boeing 737-800	7	8	159	167	
Boeing 737-800	4	8	168	176	
Total	13				
