= Yilan Town, Heilongjiang =

Yilan 依兰镇
- Town
- Location in Heilongjiang Yilan (China)
- Coordinates: 46°19′32″N 129°34′05″E
- Country: People's Republic of China
- Province: Heilongjiang
- Sub-provincial city: Harbin
- County: Yilan
- Elevation: 96 m (315 ft)
- Time zone: UTC+8 (China Standard)
- Postal code: 150000
- Area code: 0451

Yilan (simplified Chinese: 依兰; traditional Chinese: 依蘭; pinyin: Yīlán) is a town in and the seat of Yilan County in south-central Heilongjiang, China, located where the Woken (倭肯河) and Mudan Rivers flow separately into the Songhua River. It has a hukou population of 37,000 and as of 2011, It has 8 residential communities (社区) and 4 villages under its administration. It is serviced by G1011 Harbin–Tongjiang Expressway and China National Highway 221.
