= G1012 Jiansanjiang–Heixiazi Island Expressway =

Road in Heilongjiang, China

Jiansanjiang–Heixiazi Island Expressway
- 建三江－黑瞎子岛高速公路
- Jianhei Expressway 建黑高速公路

Route information
- Auxiliary route of G10
- Length: 217 km (135 mi)
- Existed: 13 August 2017–present

Major junctions
- West end: G1011 in Jiansanjiang, Heilongjiang
- East end: X109 in Fuyuan, Heilongjiang (to Hexiazi Island and future border crossing with Russia)

Location
- Country: China

Highway system
- National Trunk Highway System; Primary; Auxiliary; National Highways; Transport in China
| ← G1011 | → G1013 |

The Jiansanjiang–Heixiazi Island Expressway (Chinese: 建三江－黑瞎子岛高速公路), commonly referred to as the Jianhei Expressway (Chinese: 建黑高速公路) and designated G1012, is an expressway linking the town of Jiansanjiang with Hexiazi Island, entirely in the prefectural-level city of Jiamusi in the Chinese province of Heilongjiang. It is 217 kilometres (135 mi) in length and opened on 13 August 2017. Prior to the national-level G designation, the highway was designated S14 by the province.

In its western end, the expressway connects with the G1115 Jixi–Jiansanjiang Expressway, which continues some 22 kilometres (14 mi) north to an interchange with the national-level G1011 Harbin–Tongjiang Expressway. This section could be considered as part of G1012, but is not signed as such.

In its eastern end, the expressway ends just before a bridge to Hexiazi Island, at a junction with County Road 109 in Fuyuan. The bridge will eventually connect a new trans-national road crossing over the Amur River to the Jewish Autonomous Oblast and nearby city of Khabarovsk, in Russia.
