= JSJ =

JSJ may refer to:

- IATA code for Jiansanjiang Airport
- JSJ decomposition, a process in mathematics of decomposing a topological space
