= Shenshu =

Shenshu may refer to:

- Shenshu, Chinese divination system(s)
  - Taiyi shenshu
  - Tieban shenshu
- Shenshu (deity), Chinese guardian deity
- Shenshu, Heilongjiang, town in Tieli, Heilongjiang, China
