= Tonghe County =

Tonghe County 通河县
- County
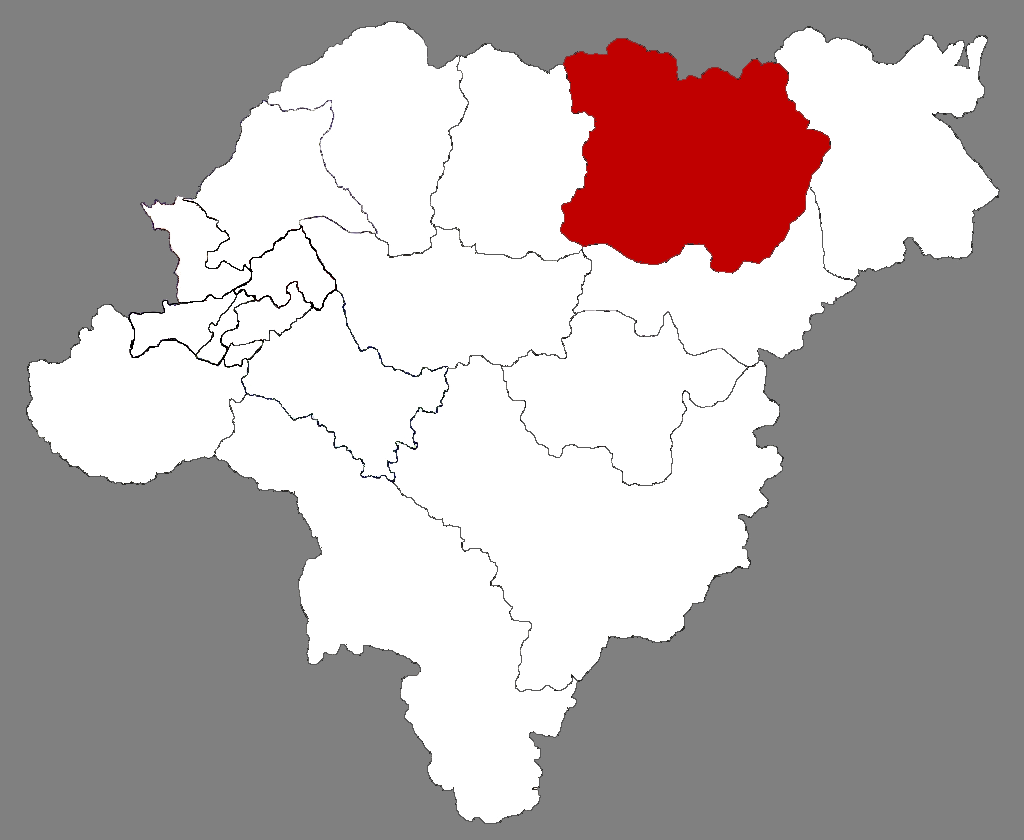
- Location of Tonghe in Harbin

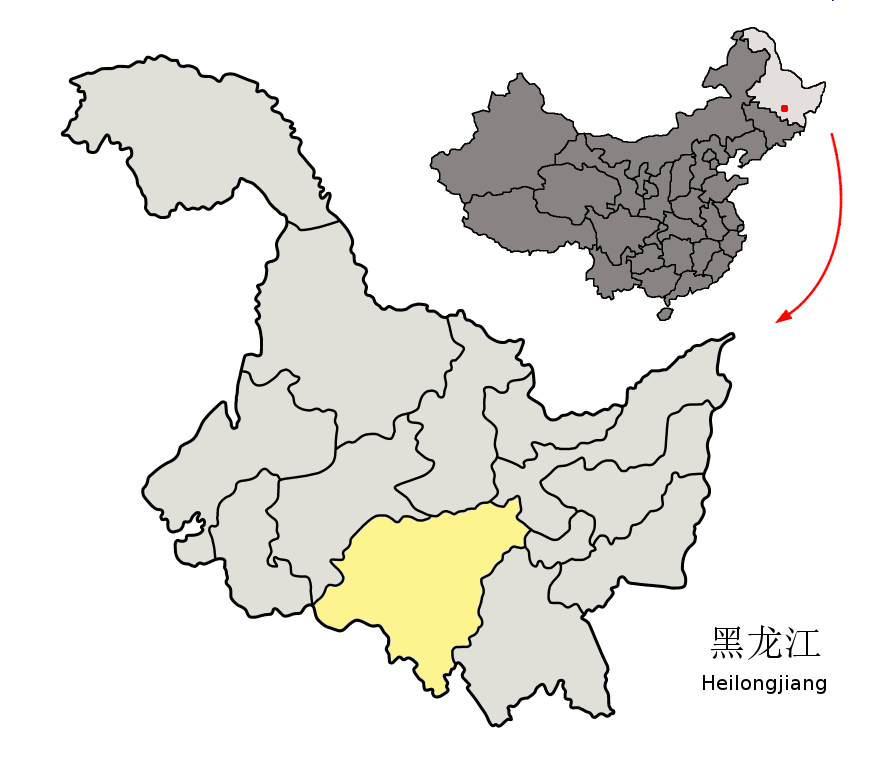
- Harbin in Heilongjiang
- Coordinates: 45°59′24″N 128°44′46″E
- Country: People's Republic of China
- Province: Heilongjiang
- Sub-provincial city: Harbin
- Divisions: 6 towns; 2 townships
- Seat: Tonghe (通河镇)

Area
  - Total: 5,675.5 km^{2} (2,191.3 sq mi)
- Elevation: 107 m (351 ft)

Population (2010)
  - Total: 210,650
  - Density: 37.116/km^{2} (96.129/sq mi)
- Time zone: UTC+8 (China Standard)
- Postal code: 1509XX
- Area code: 0451

Tonghe County (simplified Chinese: 通河县; traditional Chinese: 通河縣; pinyin: Tōnghé Xiàn; lit. 'Pass river') is under the administration of Harbin, the capital of Heilongjiang province, People's Republic of China, located on the northern (left) bank of the Songhua River. It is 161 kilometres (100 mi) to the east of central Harbin, bordering Yilan County to the east, Fangzheng County to the south, Mulan County to the west, as well as the prefecture-level city of Yichun to the north.

== Geography and climate ==
Tonghe County has a monsoon-influenced humid continental climate (Köppen Dwa/Dwb), with long, very dry, bitterly cold winters, very warm and humid summers, and short, rather dry spring and autumn in between. Its location in the Songhua River Valley at an elevation of 107 m (351 ft) allows for cool air to pool in and around the county seat, depressing temperatures slightly as compared to Harbin. The monthly 24-hour average temperature ranges from −20.4 °C (−4.7 °F) in January to 22.1 °C (71.8 °F) in July, and the annual mean is +2.93 °C (37.3 °F). Close to 65% of the annual precipitation occurs from June to August. With monthly percent possible sunshine ranging from 46% in July to 66% in February, the area receives 2,413 hours of bright sunshine annually, with the latter half of winter being especially sunny.

Climate data for Tonghe County, elevation 109 m (358 ft), (1991–2020 normals, extremes 1981–2010)
Month	Jan	Feb	Mar	Apr	May	Jun	Jul	Aug	Sep	Oct	Nov	Dec	Year
Record high °C (°F)	2.1 (35.8)	8.5 (47.3)	19.6 (67.3)	29.7 (85.5)	34.0 (93.2)	36.9 (98.4)	36.6 (97.9)	36.7 (98.1)	30.5 (86.9)	26.7 (80.1)	17.2 (63.0)	6.3 (43.3)	36.9 (98.4)
Mean daily maximum °C (°F)	−13.5 (7.7)	−7.5 (18.5)	1.9 (35.4)	12.8 (55.0)	20.5 (68.9)	25.3 (77.5)	27.4 (81.3)	25.9 (78.6)	21.0 (69.8)	11.7 (53.1)	−1.2 (29.8)	−11.6 (11.1)	9.4 (48.9)
Daily mean °C (°F)	−20.1 (−4.2)	−14.9 (5.2)	−4.5 (23.9)	6.2 (43.2)	13.9 (57.0)	19.7 (67.5)	22.5 (72.5)	20.7 (69.3)	14.2 (57.6)	5.2 (41.4)	−6.7 (19.9)	−17.5 (0.5)	3.2 (37.8)
Mean daily minimum °C (°F)	−26.1 (−15.0)	−22.0 (−7.6)	−10.8 (12.6)	−0.1 (31.8)	7.3 (45.1)	14.5 (58.1)	18.1 (64.6)	16.2 (61.2)	8.3 (46.9)	−0.4 (31.3)	−11.8 (10.8)	−22.9 (−9.2)	−2.5 (27.6)
Record low °C (°F)	−41.7 (−43.1)	−38.4 (−37.1)	−30.8 (−23.4)	−15.7 (3.7)	−5.5 (22.1)	3.5 (38.3)	9.5 (49.1)	6.8 (44.2)	−4.0 (24.8)	−19.1 (−2.4)	−30.4 (−22.7)	−35.4 (−31.7)	−41.7 (−43.1)
Average precipitation mm (inches)	4.6 (0.18)	4.2 (0.17)	11.9 (0.47)	23.0 (0.91)	61.3 (2.41)	91.1 (3.59)	151.5 (5.96)	127.3 (5.01)	61.9 (2.44)	29.5 (1.16)	16.2 (0.64)	9.0 (0.35)	591.5 (23.29)
Average precipitation days (≥ 0.1 mm)	6.3	4.7	7.2	8.3	12.9	14.0	13.9	13.9	10.4	8.6	7.6	8.7	116.5
Average snowy days	8.0	6.2	8.1	2.4	0.1	0	0	0	0	2.1	8.6	11.0	46.5
Average relative humidity (%)	75	72	68	61	64	74	82	84	78	71	73	76	73
Mean monthly sunshine hours	170.2	199.8	238.8	231.9	240.9	234.5	222.4	216.5	223.0	188.3	155.6	144.9	2,466.8
Percentage possible sunshine	60	68	64	57	52	50	47	50	60	56	56	54	56
Source: China Meteorological Administration

== Administrative divisions ==
There are eight towns in the county:

=== Towns ===
- Tonghe (通河镇)
- Wuyapao (乌鸦泡镇)
- Qinghe (清河镇)
- Nonghe (浓河镇)
- Fengshan (凤山镇)
- Xiangshun (祥顺镇)
- Sanzhan (三站镇)
- Fulin (富林镇)

== Demographics ==
The population of the district was 234,662 in 1999.

== Transport ==
- China National Highway 221
- G1011 Harbin–Tongjiang Expressway
