= G1013 Hailar–Zhangjiakou Expressway =

Road in China

Hailar–Zhangjiakou Expressway
- 海拉尔－张家口高速公路
- Haizhang Expressway 海张高速

Route information
- Auxiliary route of G10

Major junctions
- North end: Hailar District, Hulunbuir, Inner Mongolia
- South end: Zhangjiakou, Hebei

Location
- Country: China

Highway system
- National Trunk Highway System; Primary; Auxiliary; National Highways; Transport in China
← G1012	→ G1015

The Hailar–Zhangjiakou Expressway (Chinese: 海拉尔－张家口高速公路), designated as G1013 and commonly referred to as the Haizhang Expressway (Chinese: 海张高速), is an expressway in China that connects the cities of Hulunbuir, Inner Mongolia, and Zhangjiakou, Hebei. The expressway is a spur of the G10 Suifenhe–Manzhouli Expressway.

As of 2022, the Hailar-Xilinhot section is under planning, and the Xilinhot-Zhangjiakou section has been completed and opened. This opening section was originally called the Xizhang Expressway.
