= Gongnong Township, Heilongjiang =

Gongnong Township 工农乡
- Township
- Location in Heilongjiang Gongnong Township (China)
- Coordinates: 46°59′17″N 127°59′29″E
- Country: People's Republic of China
- Province: Heilongjiang
- Prefecture-level city: Yichun
- County-level city: Tieli
- Time zone: UTC+8 (China Standard)

Gongnong Township (simplified Chinese: 工农乡; traditional Chinese: 工农鄉; pinyin: Gōngnóng Xiāng) is a township under the administration of Tieli, Heilongjiang, China. As of 2018, it has 10 villages under its administration.
