= Jiangwan, Harbin =

Coordinates: 46.1556°N 129.6089°E

Jiangwan 江湾镇
- Town

Chinese transcription(s)
  - Chinese: 江湾镇
- Interactive map of Jiangwan
- Country: China
- Province: Heilongjiang
- Prefecture: Harbin
- County: Yilan
- Time zone: UTC+8 (China Standard Time)

Jiangwan Town (Chinese: 江湾镇) is a township-level division of Yilan County, Harbin Prefecture-level city, Heilongjiang Province, China.

== See also ==
- List of township-level divisions of Heilongjiang
