= Bayan County =

Bayan County 巴彦县
- County
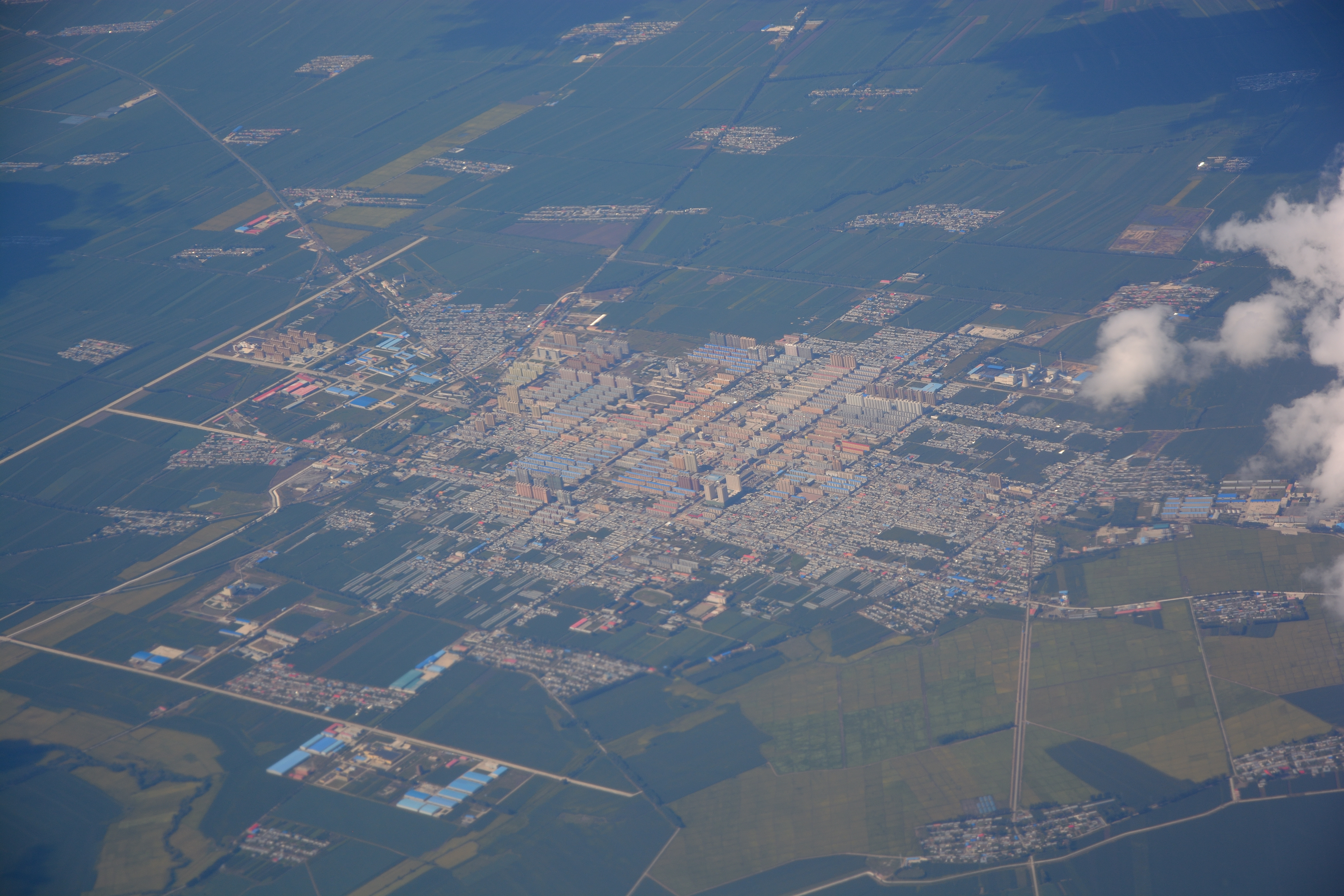

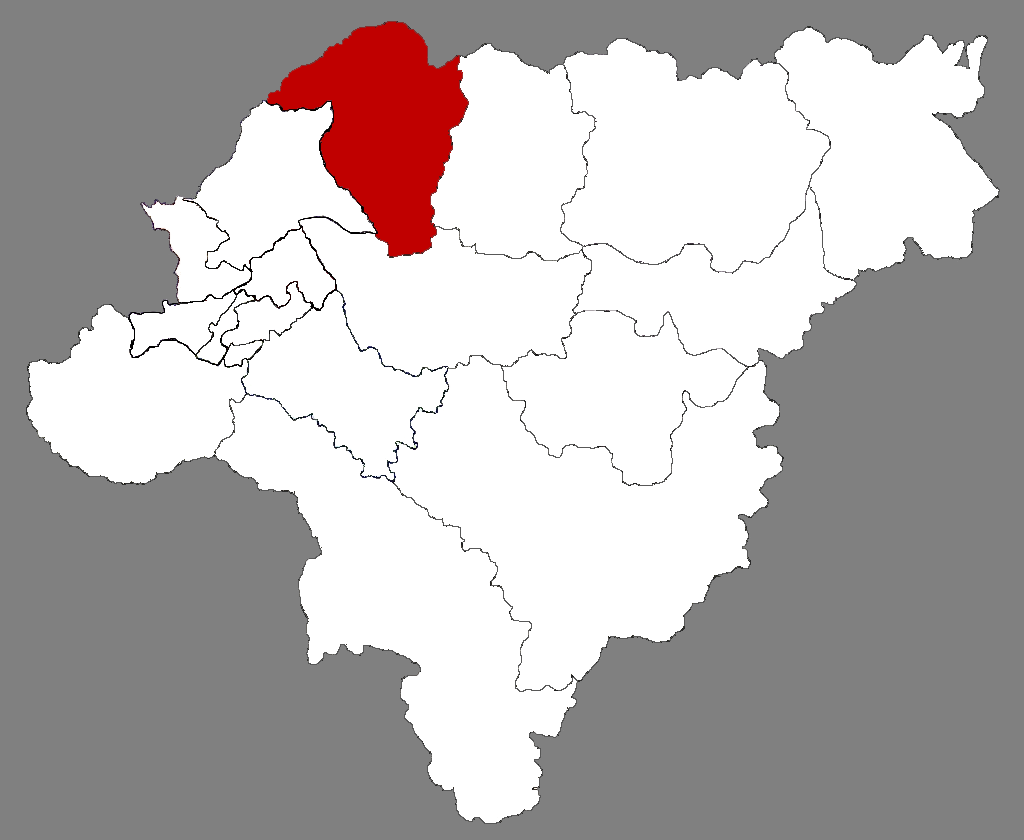
- Location of Bayan in Harbin

- Location of the seat in Heilongjiang
- Coordinates: 46°04′55″N 127°24′22″E
- Country: People's Republic of China
- Province: Heilongjiang
- Sub-provincial city: Harbin
- Divisions: 10 towns 8 townships
- Seat: Bayan Town (巴彦镇)

Area
  - Total: 3,137.7 km^{2} (1,211.5 sq mi)
- Elevation: 136 m (446 ft)

Population (2019)
  - Total: 642,241
  - Density: 204.69/km^{2} (530.13/sq mi)
- Time zone: UTC+8 (China Standard)
- Postal code: 1518XX
- Area code: 0451

Bayan County (simplified Chinese: 巴彦县; traditional Chinese: 巴彦縣; pinyin: Bāyàn Xiàn) is a county of Heilongjiang Province, Northeast China, under the administration of the prefecture-level city of Harbin, the capital of Heilongjiang. It borders Mulan County to the east, Bin County to the south, Hulan District to the west, as well as the prefecture-level city of Suihua to the north.

== Administrative divisions ==
There are ten towns and eight townships in the county:

=== Towns (镇） ===
- Bayan (巴彦镇)
- Xinglong (兴隆镇)
- Xiji (西集镇)
- Waxing (洼兴镇)
- Longquan (龙泉镇)
- Bayangang (巴彦港镇)
- Longmiao (龙庙镇)
- Wanfa (万发镇)
- Tianzeng (天增镇)
- Heishan (黑山镇)

=== Townships (乡) ===
- Songhuajiang Township (松花江乡)
- Fujiang Township (富江乡)
- Huashan Township (华山乡)
- Fengle Township (丰乐乡)
- Dexiang Township (德祥乡)
- Hongguang Township (红光乡)
- Shanhou Township (山后乡)
- Zhendong Township (镇东乡)

== Demographics ==
The population of the district was 677,955 in 1999.

== Climate ==
Climate data for Bayan, elevation 134 m (440 ft), (1991–2020 normals, extremes 1981–present)
Month	Jan	Feb	Mar	Apr	May	Jun	Jul	Aug	Sep	Oct	Nov	Dec	Year
Record high °C (°F)	1.4 (34.5)	8.3 (46.9)	20.1 (68.2)	29.8 (85.6)	35.2 (95.4)	37.9 (100.2)	36.7 (98.1)	34.8 (94.6)	30.5 (86.9)	26.0 (78.8)	17.0 (62.6)	7.0 (44.6)	37.9 (100.2)
Mean daily maximum °C (°F)	−13.5 (7.7)	−7.3 (18.9)	2.2 (36.0)	13.4 (56.1)	21.3 (70.3)	26.1 (79.0)	27.6 (81.7)	26.0 (78.8)	21.3 (70.3)	11.9 (53.4)	−0.9 (30.4)	−11.4 (11.5)	9.7 (49.5)
Daily mean °C (°F)	−20.1 (−4.2)	−14.8 (5.4)	−4.1 (24.6)	6.6 (43.9)	14.6 (58.3)	20.3 (68.5)	22.6 (72.7)	20.8 (69.4)	14.5 (58.1)	5.6 (42.1)	−6.3 (20.7)	−17.2 (1.0)	3.5 (38.4)
Mean daily minimum °C (°F)	−26.0 (−14.8)	−21.8 (−7.2)	−10.4 (13.3)	0.0 (32.0)	7.8 (46.0)	14.7 (58.5)	18.0 (64.4)	16.2 (61.2)	8.7 (47.7)	0.1 (32.2)	−11.3 (11.7)	−22.6 (−8.7)	−2.2 (28.0)
Record low °C (°F)	−42.5 (−44.5)	−41.0 (−41.8)	−30.3 (−22.5)	−14.0 (6.8)	−6.2 (20.8)	3.7 (38.7)	8.4 (47.1)	7.2 (45.0)	−4.6 (23.7)	−17.7 (0.1)	−31.1 (−24.0)	−37.1 (−34.8)	−42.5 (−44.5)
Average precipitation mm (inches)	3.0 (0.12)	4.0 (0.16)	10.2 (0.40)	22.6 (0.89)	59.8 (2.35)	112.0 (4.41)	166.4 (6.55)	129.8 (5.11)	62.4 (2.46)	26.9 (1.06)	13.0 (0.51)	6.7 (0.26)	616.8 (24.28)
Average precipitation days (≥ 0.1 mm)	4.8	3.7	5.5	7.4	12.2	14.7	14.5	13.4	9.7	7.1	5.9	6.7	105.6
Average snowy days	8.0	5.9	7.0	2.8	0.1	0	0	0	0	2.1	7.7	9.6	43.2
Average relative humidity (%)	76	72	64	55	58	70	82	84	76	68	70	76	71
Mean monthly sunshine hours	170.6	198.6	239.6	230.8	247.7	244.5	232.1	219.9	220.6	192.8	160.9	151.9	2,510
Percentage possible sunshine	60	68	65	57	53	52	49	51	59	58	57	57	57
Source: China Meteorological AdministrationAll-time May Record
