= China National Highway 221 =

Road in China

National Highway 221
- 221国道

Route information
- Length: 668 km (415 mi)

Major junctions
- From: Harbin, Heilongjiang
- To: Tongjiang, Heilongjiang

Location
- Country: China

Highway system
- National Trunk Highway System; Primary; Auxiliary
← G220	→ G222

China National Highway 221 (221国道) runs from Harbin to Tongjiang, in Heilongjiang Province. It is 668 kilometres in length and runs northeast from Harbin towards Tongjiang.

== Route and distance ==
Route and distance

City	Distance (km)
Harbin, Heilongjiang	0
Binxian, Heilongjiang	65
Fangzheng, Heilongjiang	185
Yilan, Heilongjiang	288
Jiamusi, Heilongjiang	393
Huachuan, Heilongjiang	436
Jixian, Heilongjiang	491
Fujin, Heilongjiang	591
Tongjiang, Heilongjiang	668

== See also ==
- China National Highways
