= Mulan County =

Mulan County 木兰县
- County
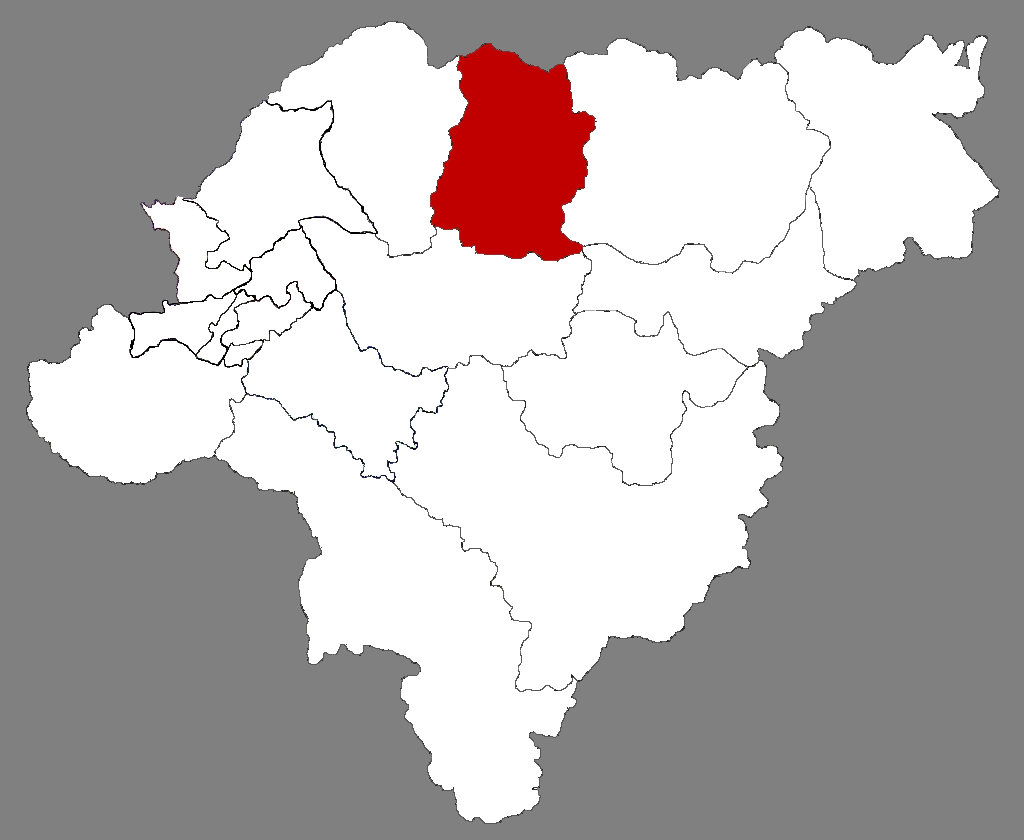
- Location of Mulan in Harbin

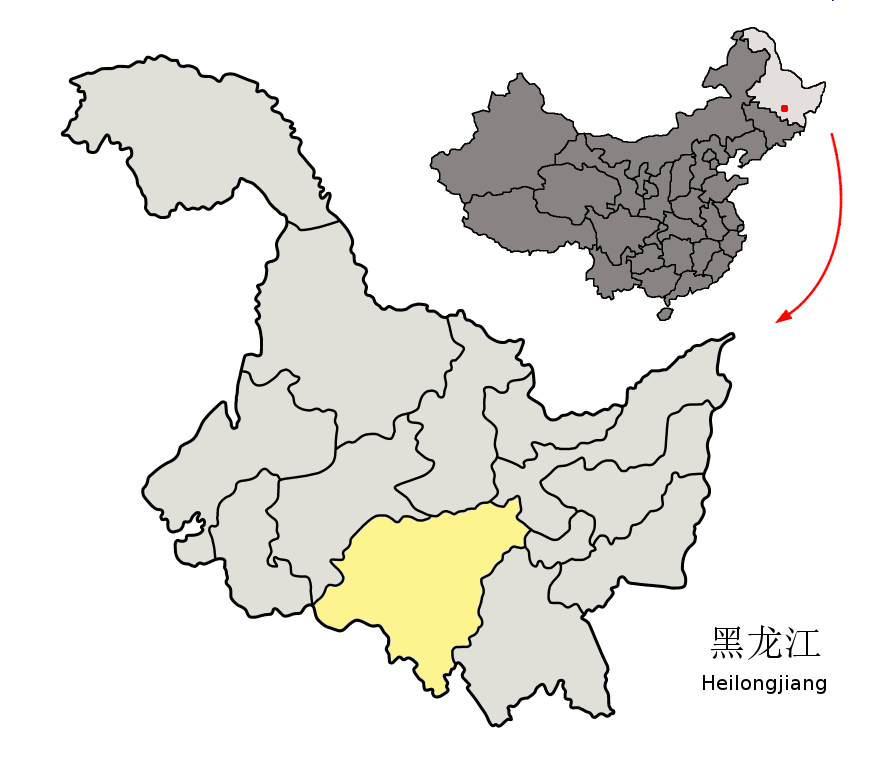
- Harbin in Heilongjiang
- Coordinates: 45°57′04″N 128°02′24″E
- Country: People's Republic of China
- Province: Heilongjiang
- Sub-provincial city: Harbin

Area
  - Total: 3,600.0 km^{2} (1,390.0 sq mi)

Population (2010)
  - Total: 277,685
  - Density: 77.135/km^{2} (199.78/sq mi)
- Time zone: UTC+8 (China Standard)
- Postal code: 1519XX

Mulan County (simplified Chinese: 木兰县; traditional Chinese: 木蘭縣; pinyin: Mùlán Xiàn) is a county of Heilongjiang Province, Northeast China, under the administration of the prefecture-level city of Harbin, the capital of Heilongjiang. It borders Tonghe County to the east, Fangzheng County to the southeast, Bin County to the south, and Bayan County to the west, as well as the prefecture-level city of Suihua to the north. The county is not related to Chinese figure Hua Mulan.

== Administrative divisions ==
Mulan County is divided into 6 towns and 2 townships.

6 towns

- Mulan (木兰镇), Dongxing (东兴镇), Dagui (大贵镇), Lidong (利东镇), Liuhe (柳河镇), Xinmin (新民镇)

2 townships

- Jianguo (建国乡), Jixing (吉兴乡)

== Demographics ==
The population of the district was 256,302 in 1999.

== Climate ==
Climate data for Mulan, elevation 117 m (384 ft), (1991–2020 normals, extremes 1981–present)
Month	Jan	Feb	Mar	Apr	May	Jun	Jul	Aug	Sep	Oct	Nov	Dec	Year
Record high °C (°F)	2.8 (37.0)	8.1 (46.6)	20.1 (68.2)	29.5 (85.1)	35.1 (95.2)	37.2 (99.0)	36.5 (97.7)	36.2 (97.2)	30.9 (87.6)	26.4 (79.5)	17.8 (64.0)	7.3 (45.1)	37.2 (99.0)
Mean daily maximum °C (°F)	−13.2 (8.2)	−7.0 (19.4)	2.4 (36.3)	13.3 (55.9)	21.0 (69.8)	26.0 (78.8)	28.1 (82.6)	26.5 (79.7)	21.3 (70.3)	12.0 (53.6)	−0.7 (30.7)	−11.3 (11.7)	9.9 (49.8)
Daily mean °C (°F)	−20.4 (−4.7)	−14.8 (5.4)	−4.0 (24.8)	6.8 (44.2)	14.6 (58.3)	20.3 (68.5)	23.2 (73.8)	21.3 (70.3)	14.8 (58.6)	5.7 (42.3)	−6.3 (20.7)	−17.5 (0.5)	3.6 (38.6)
Mean daily minimum °C (°F)	−26.7 (−16.1)	−22.1 (−7.8)	−10.5 (13.1)	0.2 (32.4)	7.9 (46.2)	14.8 (58.6)	18.5 (65.3)	16.8 (62.2)	9.0 (48.2)	0.2 (32.4)	−11.4 (11.5)	−23.1 (−9.6)	−2.2 (28.0)
Record low °C (°F)	−42.9 (−45.2)	−42.5 (−44.5)	−31.0 (−23.8)	−14.4 (6.1)	−4.8 (23.4)	3.4 (38.1)	9.8 (49.6)	7.5 (45.5)	−4.1 (24.6)	−21.7 (−7.1)	−32.5 (−26.5)	−38.0 (−36.4)	−42.9 (−45.2)
Average precipitation mm (inches)	4.2 (0.17)	5.4 (0.21)	12.6 (0.50)	23.1 (0.91)	61.3 (2.41)	108.2 (4.26)	167.0 (6.57)	134.3 (5.29)	66.7 (2.63)	30.6 (1.20)	17.0 (0.67)	8.9 (0.35)	639.3 (25.17)
Average precipitation days (≥ 0.1 mm)	4.8	4.2	6.5	7.7	12.2	14.4	14.5	14.4	10.3	7.7	6.7	7.2	110.6
Average snowy days	9.1	6.8	8.4	3.0	0	0	0	0	0.1	2.8	8.8	11.1	50.1
Average relative humidity (%)	74	70	64	56	60	70	78	81	74	68	70	75	70
Mean monthly sunshine hours	150.8	177.8	218.8	210.0	229.1	228.9	220.1	203.5	210.6	180.9	143.3	128.3	2,302.1
Percentage possible sunshine	53	60	59	51	50	49	47	47	57	54	51	48	52
Source: China Meteorological Administration All-time May Record
