= Shenshu, Heilongjiang =

Shenshu 神树镇
- Town
- Location in Heilongjiang
- Coordinates: 46°56′51″N 128°25′48″E
- Country: People's Republic of China
- Province: Heilongjiang
- Prefecture-level city: Yichun
- County-level city: Tieli
- Time zone: UTC+8 (China Standard)

Shenshu (Chinese: 神树; pinyin: Shénshù) is a town under the administration of Tieli, Heilongjiang, China. As of 2023, it administers Shenshu Community, Shenshu Village, Jiling Village (鸡岭村), Shichang Village (石长村), and Wulongshan Village (五龙山村).
