= Yilan County, Heilongjiang =

Yilan County 依兰县 I-lan
- County
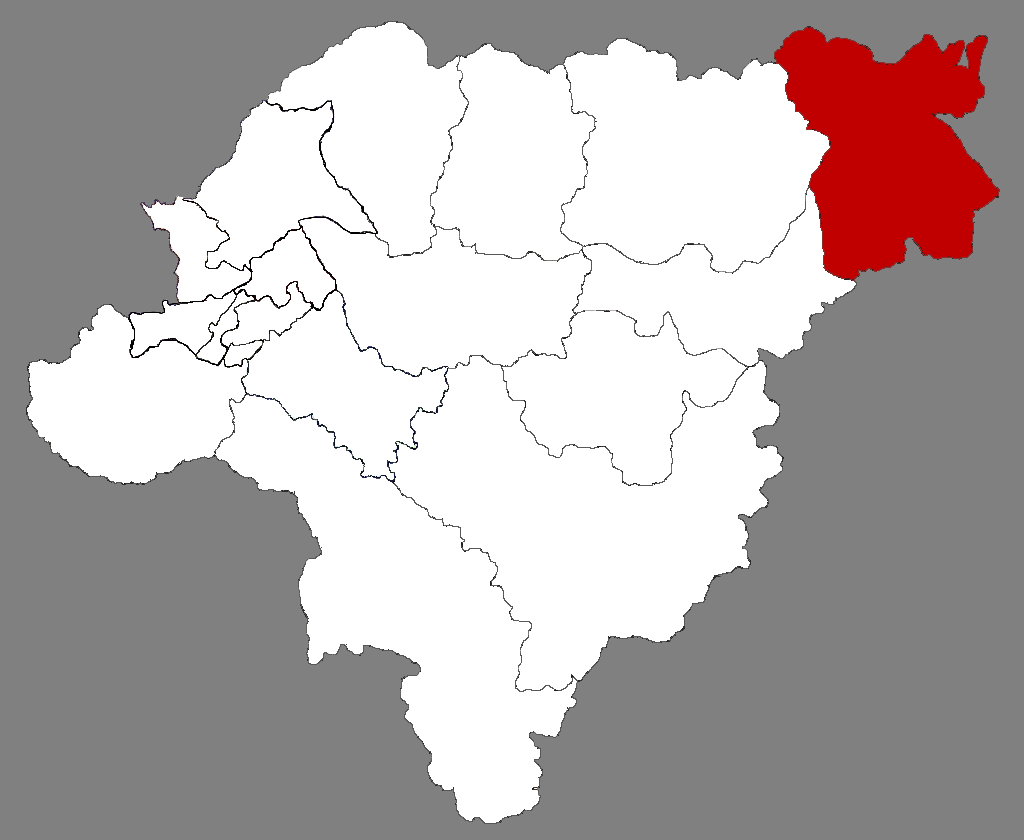
- Location of Yilan in Harbin

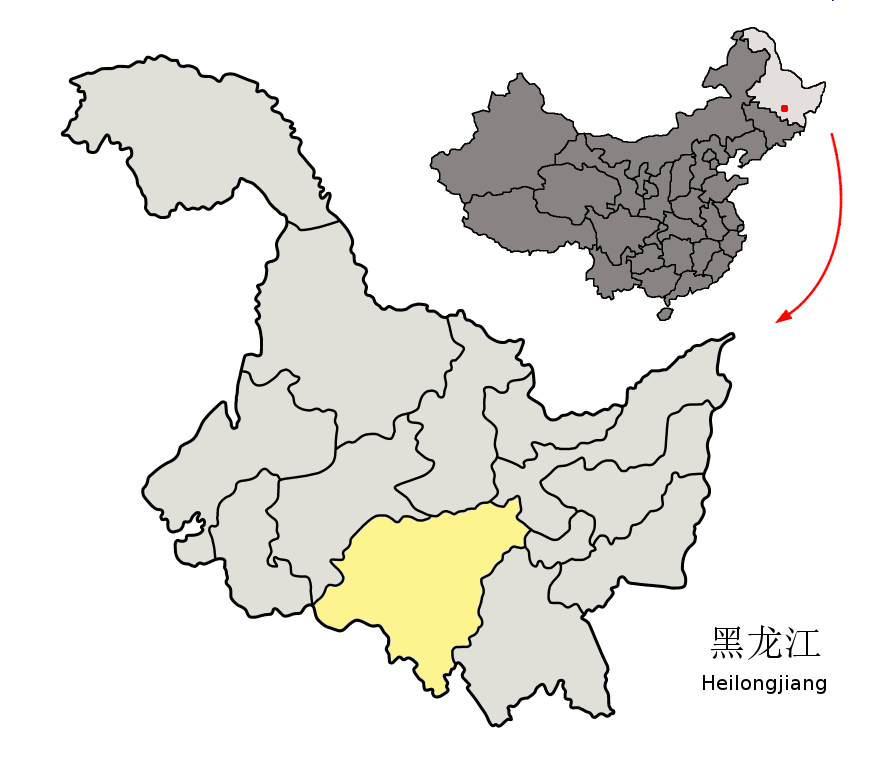
- Harbin in Heilongjiang
- Coordinates: 46°19′01″N 129°33′43″E
- Country: People's Republic of China
- Province: Heilongjiang
- Sub-provincial city: Harbin

Area
  - Total: 4,616.0 km^{2} (1,782.2 sq mi)
- Elevation: 97 m (318 ft)

Population (2010)
  - Total: 388,319
  - Density: 84.125/km^{2} (217.88/sq mi)
- Time zone: UTC+8 (China Standard)
- Postal code: 1548XX
- Website: hrbyl.gov.cn

Yilan County (simplified Chinese: 依兰县; traditional Chinese: 依蘭縣; pinyin: Yīlán Xiàn; IPA: [í.lǎn ɕjɛ̂n]) is a county of Heilongjiang Province, Northeast China, under the administration of the prefecture-level city of Harbin, the capital of Heilongjiang. It is more than 240 kilometres (150 mi) to the east-northeast of central Harbin. Its county seat, which is also called Yilan (Yilan Town, Yilan zhen), is located near the confluence of the Mudan River (formerly known as the Hurka River) with the Sungari, near the eponymous Yilan crater. The easternmost county-level division of Harbin City, it borders Fangzheng County to the southwest, Tonghe County to the west, as well as the prefecture-level cities of Yichun to the north, Jiamusi to the northeast, Qitaihe to the southeast, and Mudanjiang to the south.

== Transportation ==
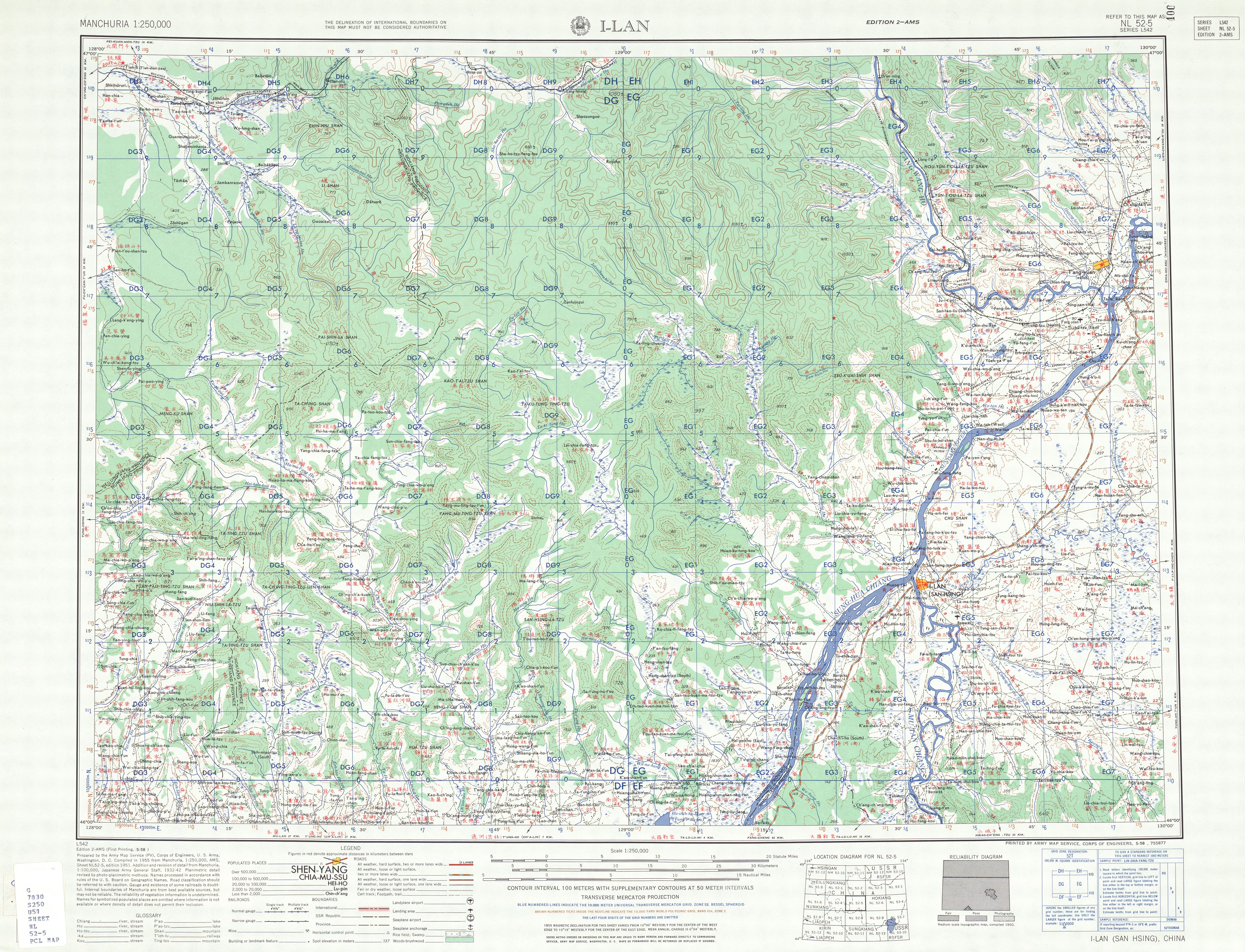
Map including Yilan (labeled as 依蘭 I-LAN (SAN-HSING) 三姓) (AMS, 1955)

- China National Highway 221

Station on the Harbin-Jiamusi intercity railway is located in the Sijianfang district, 5 km from town center.

== History ==
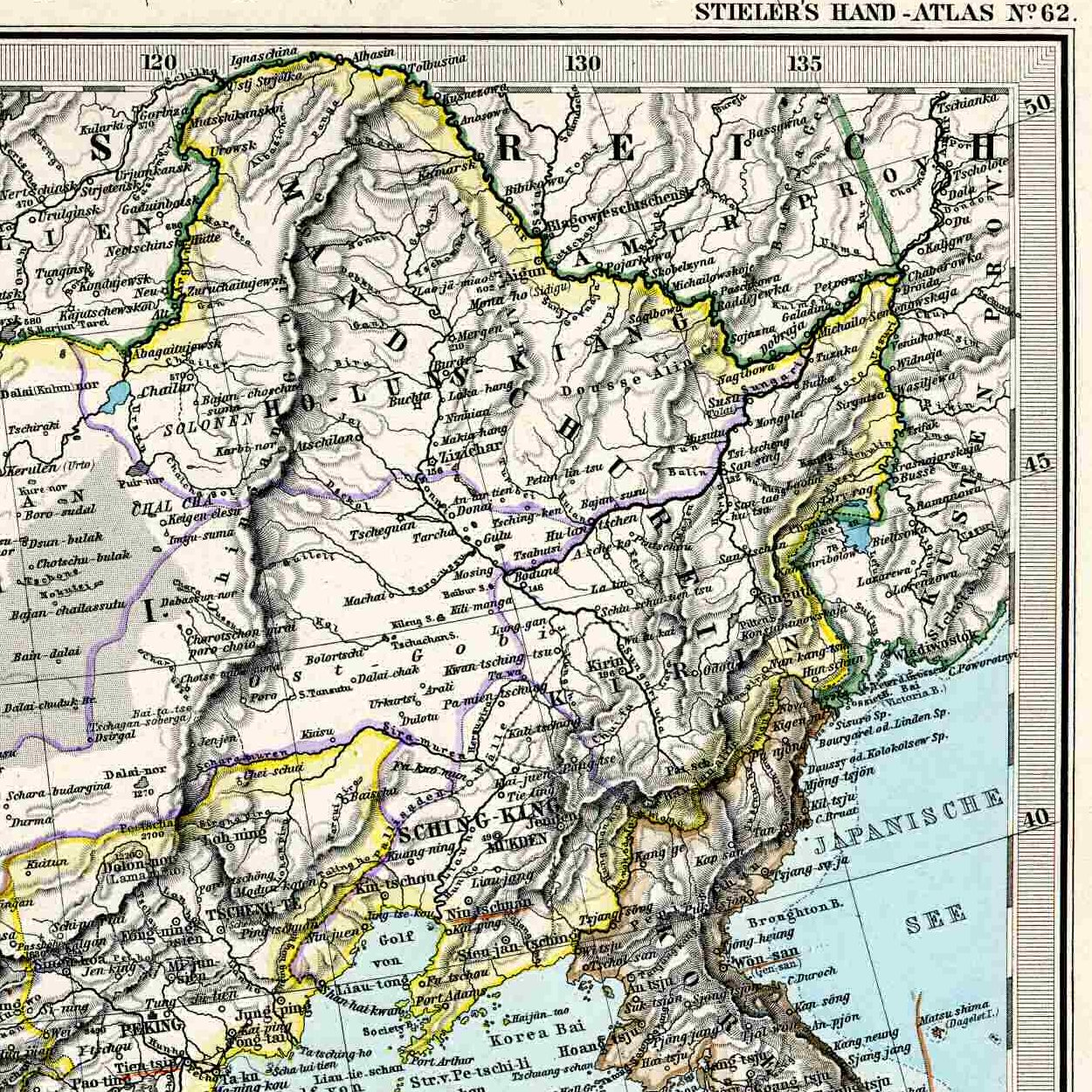
A German map from 1891 showing San sing at the fall of the Hurka River into the Sungari

During the rule of the Ming dynasty in China, Yilan, formerly known as Sanxing (三姓; Wade–Giles: San-hsing; historically also Romanized as San Sing), was one of the two important centers of the Jianzhou Jurchens of the Hurka River valley. (The other center was Ninguta in the upper reaches of the Hurka). Its Jurchen name was Ilantumen.

The town retained its importance into the Qing period, and in 1692 became the seat of a deputy lieutenant-general (副都統; fù dūtǒng). Subordinated to the governor general (jiangjun) in Jilin City. the Sanxing fu dutong was in control of the northeastern section of Jilin Province (which in those days was much larger than now) – a large region stretching northeast along the Sungari and the Amur to the Pacific Ocean.

In 1887, three British travelers – H. E. M. James, Francis Younghusband and Harry English Fulford – visited Sanxing on their tour of Manchuria. According to Fulford's account, the town had a population of around 10,000, with trade in furs and fish (salmon and sturgeon) being its main industries.

In May 1932, Yilan County was captured by the advancing 10th Division of the Imperial Japanese Army, and Chinese forces were withdrawn from Yilan on the 17th of that month. Afterwards, the division constructed Yilan County's first airfield in 1932, Yilan Airport. It entered service in September 1933, and in July 1934, the Japanese opened the Harbin-Yilan route, having round trips three days a week. The airport serviced Yilan County until closure in 1979 when it was replaced by Harbin Yanjiagnag Airport, having become poorly equipped and barely paved.

Lu Houmin, who was the official photographer for the top Chinese leaders particularly Mao Zedong from 1950 to 1964 was born in Yilan.

== Climate ==
Climate data for Yilan, elevation 100 m (330 ft), (1991–2020 normals, extremes 1971–2010)
Month	Jan	Feb	Mar	Apr	May	Jun	Jul	Aug	Sep	Oct	Nov	Dec	Year
Record high °C (°F)	2.0 (35.6)	9.0 (48.2)	20.2 (68.4)	29.4 (84.9)	34.3 (93.7)	37.4 (99.3)	37.8 (100.0)	37.2 (99.0)	30.6 (87.1)	27.0 (80.6)	16.3 (61.3)	6.1 (43.0)	37.8 (100.0)
Mean daily maximum °C (°F)	−12.3 (9.9)	−6.5 (20.3)	2.4 (36.3)	13.1 (55.6)	20.7 (69.3)	25.4 (77.7)	27.6 (81.7)	25.9 (78.6)	21.0 (69.8)	11.9 (53.4)	−0.8 (30.6)	−10.8 (12.6)	9.8 (49.7)
Daily mean °C (°F)	−17.2 (1.0)	−12.4 (9.7)	−3.5 (25.7)	6.6 (43.9)	14.3 (57.7)	19.6 (67.3)	22.6 (72.7)	20.7 (69.3)	14.5 (58.1)	5.8 (42.4)	−5.5 (22.1)	−15.2 (4.6)	4.2 (39.5)
Mean daily minimum °C (°F)	−21.5 (−6.7)	−18.0 (−0.4)	−9.3 (15.3)	0.4 (32.7)	8.0 (46.4)	14.3 (57.7)	18.0 (64.4)	16.3 (61.3)	8.9 (48.0)	0.5 (32.9)	−9.7 (14.5)	−19.1 (−2.4)	−0.9 (30.3)
Record low °C (°F)	−35.0 (−31.0)	−31.8 (−25.2)	−26.9 (−16.4)	−12.6 (9.3)	−4.1 (24.6)	4.8 (40.6)	10.6 (51.1)	7.0 (44.6)	−3.0 (26.6)	−13.2 (8.2)	−25.7 (−14.3)	−32.9 (−27.2)	−35.0 (−31.0)
Average precipitation mm (inches)	4.8 (0.19)	4.8 (0.19)	14.5 (0.57)	24.6 (0.97)	56.9 (2.24)	83.1 (3.27)	138.3 (5.44)	131.4 (5.17)	61.7 (2.43)	31.1 (1.22)	15.3 (0.60)	10.0 (0.39)	576.5 (22.68)
Average precipitation days (≥ 0.1 mm)	5.1	4.3	7.4	8.4	12.3	13.5	13.8	13.5	9.9	7.7	6.6	7.4	109.9
Average snowy days	7.2	5.9	8.1	3.2	0.1	0	0	0	0	1.8	7.9	9.6	43.8
Average relative humidity (%)	71	66	61	57	61	72	80	83	77	66	68	72	70
Mean monthly sunshine hours	147.8	177.5	212.4	204.4	225.6	224.5	222.0	216.6	219.3	186.6	147.2	134.9	2,318.8
Percentage possible sunshine	53	60	57	50	49	48	47	50	59	56	53	51	53
Source 1: China Meteorological Administration
Source 2: Weather China

== Administrative divisions ==
Yilan County is divided into 6 towns, 2 townships and 1 ethnic township.

6 towns

- Yilan (依兰镇), Dalianhe (达连河镇), Jiangwan (江湾镇), Sandaogang (三道岗镇), Daotaiqiao (道台桥镇), Hongkeli (宏克利镇)

2 townships

- Tuanshanzi (团山子乡), Yugong (愚公乡)

1 ethnic township

- Yinglan Korean (迎兰朝鲜族乡)
