= Jiansanjiang =

Jiansanjiang 建三江
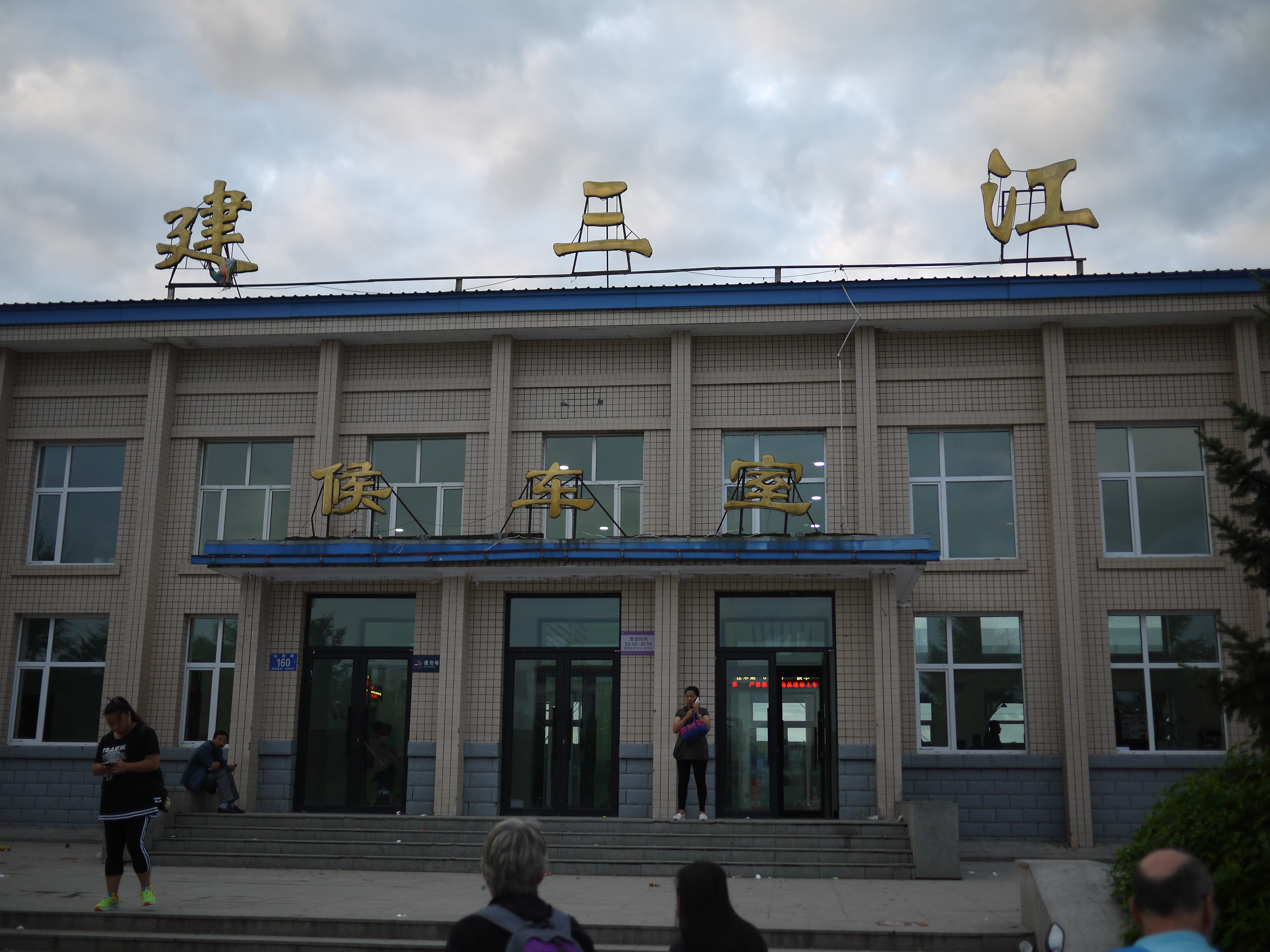
- Jiansanjiang train station
- Nickname: Sanjiang (Chinese: 三江)
- Location in Heilongjiang
- Coordinates: 47.255°N 132.626°E
- Country: People's Republic of China
- Province: Heilongjiang
- Prefecture-level city: Jiamusi
- County-level city: Fujin

Population
  - Total: 270,000
- Time zone: UTC+8 (China Standard)
- Climate: Dwb
- Website: http://china-jsj.com/

Jiansanjiang
- Chinese: 建三江
Transcriptions
Standard Mandarin
- Hanyu Pinyin: Jiànsānjiāng Guǎnlǐjú júzhí

Jiansanjiang (Chinese: 建三江; pinyin: Jiànsānjiāng; lit. 'built on the Sanjiang Plain') is a Nongken agricultural colony, under the management of Beidahuang Group of State Farms and Land Reclamation Jiansanjiang Branch. The area, consisting of 15 state farms, is situated in the eastern part of Heilongjiang province, China, across Fujin City, Tongjiang City, Fuyuan City, and Raohe County. Population of the area is about 270,000. About 8 million tons of food are produced by the area every year.

== Administration ==
Until year 2017, the government function of the area was performed by the Heilongjiang Bureau of State Farms and Land Reclamation, instead of by local governments. The government of Heilongjiang province pushed for changes that year, converting the Bureau into a purely economic corporation, with local governments taking up the role of governance including law enforcement. The Bureau was officially converted into a state owned enterprise in 2019 with the government functions having already been gradually transferred to local governments.

== Agriculture ==
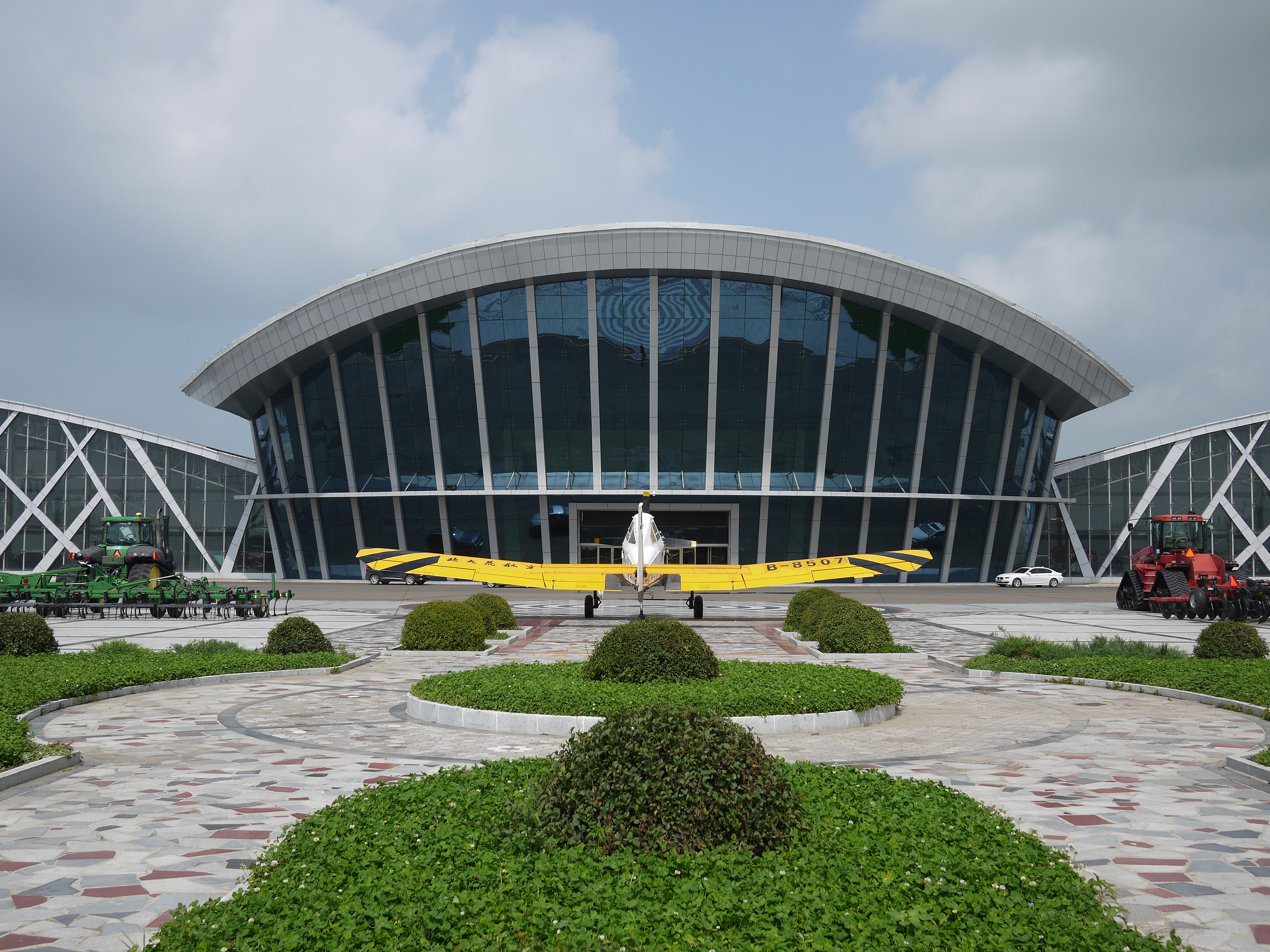
Agricultural vehicles on display at a museum in Jiansanjiang

Being an agricultural colony (Chinese: 农垦; pinyin: nóngkěn) under the management of the former Heilongjiang Bureau of State Farms and Land Reclamation, Jiansanjiang has a rich history of agriculture, and is known for having areas of chernozemic soil. The city is discussed in detail in academic papers on agriculture in China; notably, China Agricultural University has an experimental station looking at rice varieties in the city.

Jiansanjiang is known as China's green rice city, and its Honghe farm (Chinese: 洪河农场; lit. 'grand river farm') was the first modernised farm in the whole of China, making use of agricultural drones and other technologies.

== Detection camp ==
In 2014, it was reported that the local administration made use of its special legal status to set up "Legal detention centers" that are illegal in nature to target people associated with Falun Gong. These facilities had previously been used for torture. In addition, four human rights lawyers, Tang Jitian, Jiang Tianyong, Wang Cheng, and Zhang Junjie who provided legal assistance to these victims were also detained, tortured, and injured. This incident caused the facilities to be described as "black jails" in reports and media, and as "brainwashing classes" by local residents. These lawyers continue to be monitored by the Chinese government a decade after the incident.

== Transportation ==
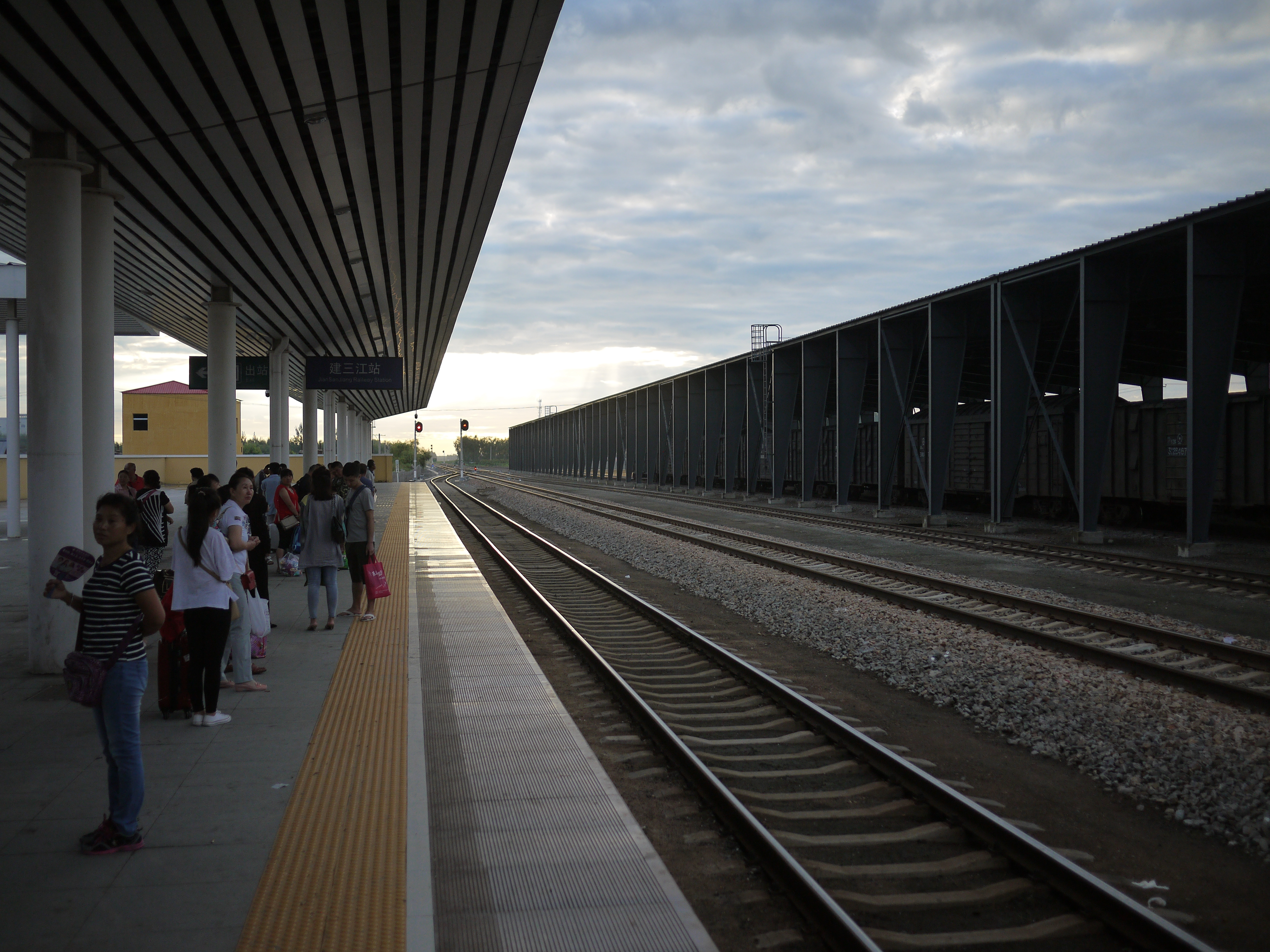
Jiansanjiang train station

Jiansanjiang Shidi Airport was opened in October 2017. By road, Jiansanjiang connects to the G1011 via the S11 Jianji Expressway.

Jiansanjiang also connects to Harbin (via Jiamusi) and Fuyuan by rail.

== Science ==
The asteroid 207723 Jiansanjiang is named after the city.
