= Hulan River =

River in Heilongjiang, China

The Hulan River (Chinese: 呼兰河; pinyin: Hūlán Hé; English: Call Orchid) is a river in Heilongjiang Province, China.

The Hulan rises in the Lesser Khingan mountains, south of Yichun (47.21995°N 128.57644°E) and flows west past Tieli to the north of Suihua. After a confluence with the Tongken River, it turns south to join the Songhua River in Hulan County, where it flows into the new Dadingshan Reservoir, just east of Harbin (45.92531°N 126.78767°E).

The river meanders extensively across the Northeast China Plain, creating many bifurcations and oxbow lakes. The approximate length of the river is 350 km, however there is often more than one stream, and the actual distance—including all the bends—is measured at 532 km. The area of the catchment basin is 31,207 km^{2}.

It has a wide floodplain of fertile black soil. After a comprehensive management plan for the river basin was implemented in the 1950s, it became a center of production for grain, flax, and sugar beet.

There is a tributary called the Xiaohulan River (Little Hulan), which flows northwest to join the main river west of Tieli. Other tributaries include the Yijimi, Ougen, Liu, Gemuke, Nuomin, Ni, and Tongken Rivers.

On 1 April 2020, the river suffered pollution from Molybdenum and related refining materials from a smelter in Yichun.

== See also ==
- Hulan County
- Tales of Hulan River, by Xiao Hong. The book is not truly pertaining to the river itself but rather it describes life in Hulan County, an eastern suburb of Harbin, on the west bank of the river in the period between 1910-1930.
