= Tieli =

Tieli 铁力市
- County-level city
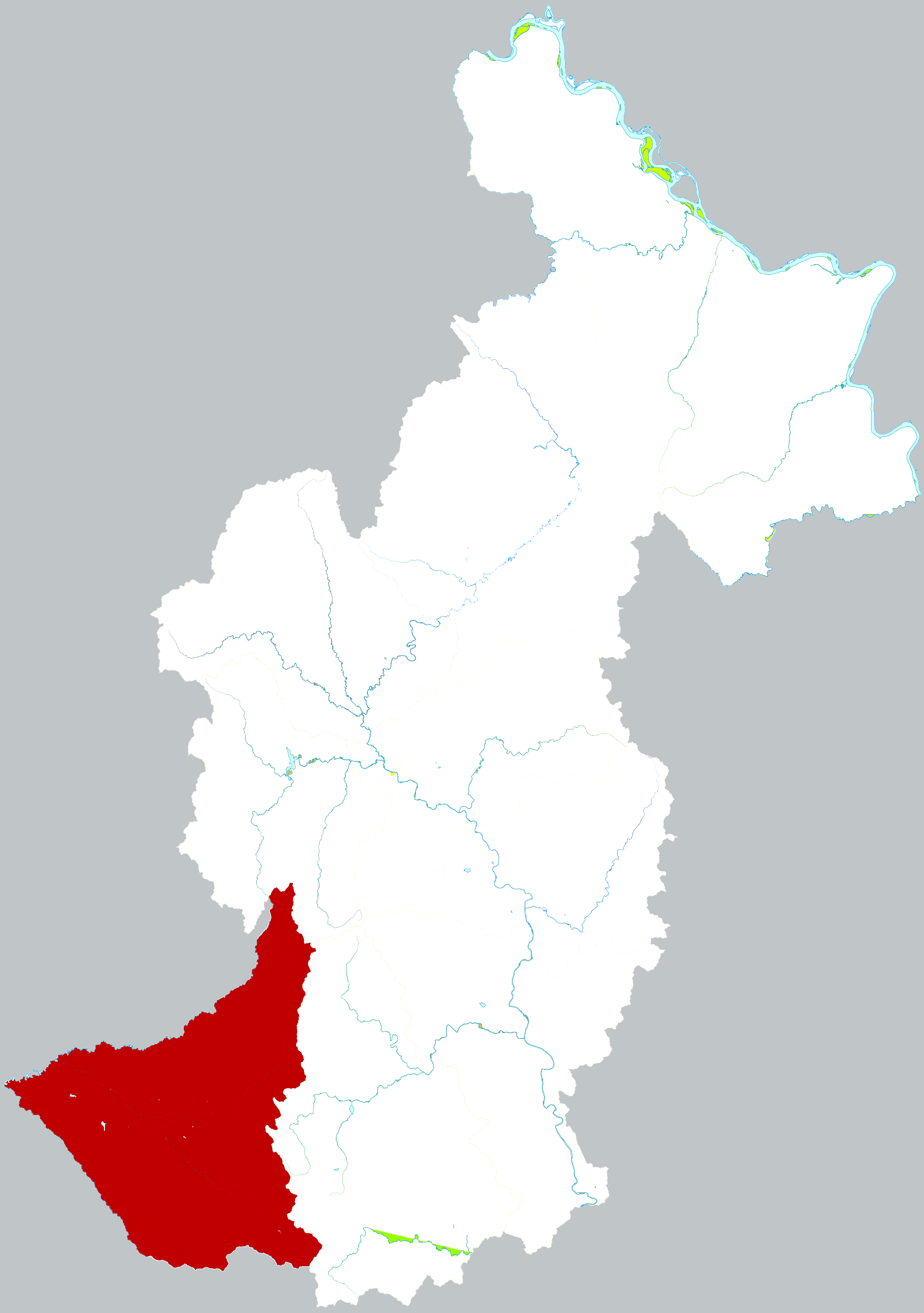

- Location in Heilongjiang
- Coordinates: 46°57′N 128°03′E
- Country: People's Republic of China
- Province: Heilongjiang
- Prefecture-level city: Yichun

Area
  - Total: 6,593.3 km^{2} (2,545.7 sq mi)

Population (2010)
  - Total: 235,158
  - Density: 35.666/km^{2} (92.375/sq mi)
- Time zone: UTC+8 (China Standard)
- Postal code: 152500
- Area code: 0458
- Climate: Dwb
- Website: http://www.tls.gov.cn/

Tieli (Chinese: 铁力; pinyin: Tiělì; English: Iron Strength) is a county-level city in Heilongjiang Province, China, on the east bank of the Hulan River.

The city has a population of 235,158 (2010).

Tieli is under administration of the prefecture-level city of Yichun.

== Administrative divisions ==
Tieli City is divided into 4 towns, 2 townships and 1 ethnic township.

4 towns

- Tieli (铁力镇), Shuangfeng (双丰镇), Taoshan (桃山镇), Shenshu (神树镇)

2 townships

- Gongnong (工农乡), Wangyang (王杨乡)

1 ethnic township

- Nianfeng Korean (年丰朝鲜族乡)

== Climate ==
Climate data for Tieli, elevation 206 m (676 ft), (1991–2020 normals, extremes 1981–present)
Month	Jan	Feb	Mar	Apr	May	Jun	Jul	Aug	Sep	Oct	Nov	Dec	Year
Record high °C (°F)	−0.2 (31.6)	8.7 (47.7)	18.7 (65.7)	28.2 (82.8)	33.7 (92.7)	36.5 (97.7)	36.3 (97.3)	36.1 (97.0)	30.0 (86.0)	25.8 (78.4)	14.5 (58.1)	4.9 (40.8)	36.5 (97.7)
Mean daily maximum °C (°F)	−14.7 (5.5)	−8.8 (16.2)	0.8 (33.4)	12.0 (53.6)	20.1 (68.2)	25.0 (77.0)	27.1 (80.8)	25.4 (77.7)	20.2 (68.4)	10.8 (51.4)	−2.1 (28.2)	−12.6 (9.3)	8.6 (47.5)
Daily mean °C (°F)	−21.7 (−7.1)	−16.3 (2.7)	−5.5 (22.1)	5.7 (42.3)	13.7 (56.7)	19.4 (66.9)	22.2 (72.0)	20.2 (68.4)	13.6 (56.5)	4.6 (40.3)	−7.6 (18.3)	−18.8 (−1.8)	2.5 (36.4)
Mean daily minimum °C (°F)	−27.3 (−17.1)	−23.0 (−9.4)	−11.7 (10.9)	−0.4 (31.3)	7.1 (44.8)	13.9 (57.0)	17.5 (63.5)	15.5 (59.9)	7.8 (46.0)	−0.7 (30.7)	−12.6 (9.3)	−24 (−11)	−3.2 (26.3)
Record low °C (°F)	−41.4 (−42.5)	−38.4 (−37.1)	−30.8 (−23.4)	−12.2 (10.0)	−6.4 (20.5)	2.6 (36.7)	7.8 (46.0)	5.2 (41.4)	−5.6 (21.9)	−17.0 (1.4)	−33.3 (−27.9)	−38.7 (−37.7)	−41.4 (−42.5)
Average precipitation mm (inches)	5.2 (0.20)	5.9 (0.23)	13.5 (0.53)	23.4 (0.92)	59.7 (2.35)	119.1 (4.69)	167.8 (6.61)	139.7 (5.50)	70.0 (2.76)	32.9 (1.30)	14.3 (0.56)	10.9 (0.43)	662.4 (26.08)
Average precipitation days (≥ 0.1 mm)	7.2	5.8	6.8	8.3	12.8	15.3	15.4	15.2	10.6	8.8	7.7	10.0	123.9
Average snowy days	11.9	9.2	9.4	4.6	0.1	0	0	0	0	3.4	9.9	13.8	62.3
Average relative humidity (%)	75	71	63	57	59	70	79	81	75	67	70	76	70
Mean monthly sunshine hours	150.8	186.8	237.3	221.8	248.9	243.6	231.2	217.7	216.7	180.4	150.1	130.6	2,415.9
Percentage possible sunshine	54	64	64	54	53	52	49	50	58	54	54	49	55
Source: China Meteorological AdministrationAll-time May Record
