= Hulan District =

Hulan 呼兰区
- District
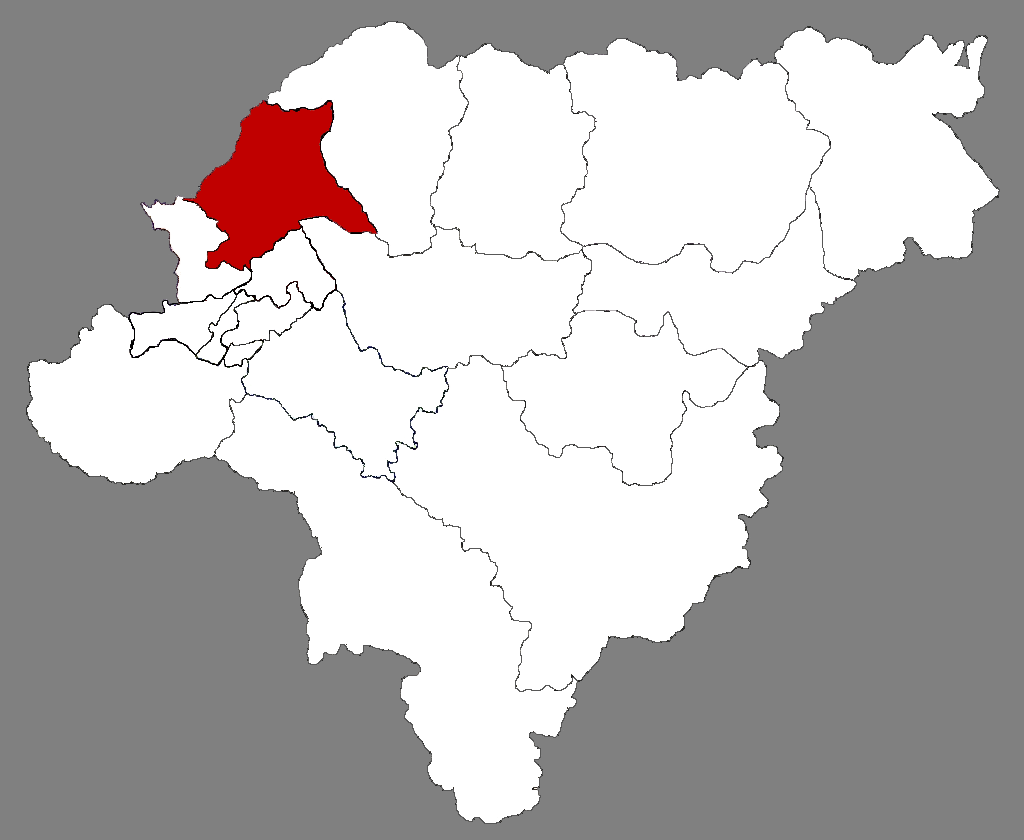
- Location of Hulan in Harbin

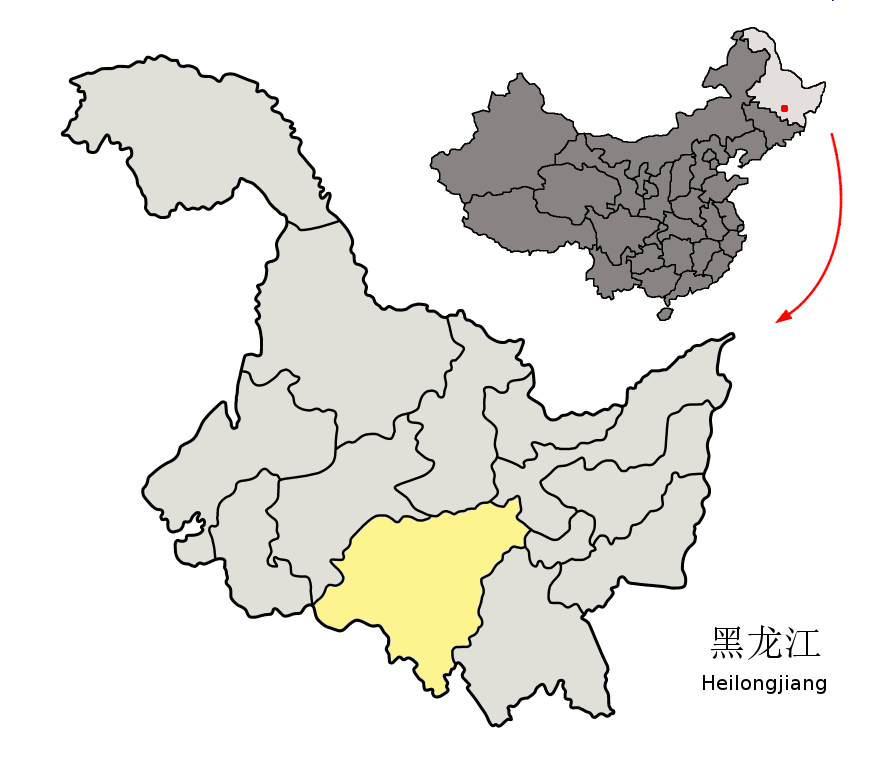
- Harbin in Heilongjiang
- Coordinates: 45°53′21″N 126°35′18″E
- Country: People's Republic of China
- Province: Heilongjiang
- Sub-provincial city: Harbin

Area
  - Total: 2,185.9 km^{2} (844.0 sq mi)

Population (2019)
  - Total: 527,705
  - Density: 241.41/km^{2} (625.26/sq mi)
- Time zone: UTC+8 (China Standard)
- Postal code: 1505XX
- Website: hulan.gov.cn

Hulan District (simplified Chinese: 呼兰区; traditional Chinese: 呼蘭區; pinyin: Hūlán Qū) is one of nine districts of the prefecture-level city of Harbin, the capital of Heilongjiang Province, Northeast China. It covers part of the northeastern suburbs. The district was approved to establish from the former Hulan County (呼兰县) by the Chinese State Council on February 4, 2004. It borders Bayan County to the east, Bin County to the southeast, Daowai District to the south, and Songbei District to the southwest, as well as the prefecture-level city of Suihua to the northwest.

== History ==
After World War II, the Hulan District was home of Manchukuo veterans who became homeless because they failed to conscript the newly People's Liberation Army.

== Administrative divisions ==
Hulan District is divided into 17 subdistricts, 7 towns and 3 townships.

17 subdistricts

- Hulan (呼兰街道), Lanhe (兰河街道), Yaobo (腰卜街道), Limin (利民街道), Kangjin (康金街道), Shuangjing (双井街道), Jianshelu (建设路街道), Xueyuanlu (学院路街道), Zhangling (长岭街道), Shenjia (沈家街道), Nanjinglu (南京路街道), Yumin (裕民街道), Yutian (裕田街道), Yuqiang (裕强街道), Xiaoxiang (萧乡街道), Gongyuanlu (公园路街道), Sandian (三电街道)

7 towns

- Erba (二八镇), Shiren (石人镇), Baikui (白奎镇), Fangtai (方台镇), Lianhua (莲花镇), Dayong (大用镇), Liye (利业镇)

3 townships

- Yanglin (杨林乡), Xubo (许卜乡), Mengjia (孟家乡)

== Climate ==
Climate data for Hulan, elevation 135 m (443 ft), (1991–2020 normals, extremes 1981–2010)
Month	Jan	Feb	Mar	Apr	May	Jun	Jul	Aug	Sep	Oct	Nov	Dec	Year
Record high °C (°F)	1.5 (34.7)	9.9 (49.8)	19.9 (67.8)	31.0 (87.8)	34.3 (93.7)	38.7 (101.7)	36.7 (98.1)	35.1 (95.2)	31.5 (88.7)	26.0 (78.8)	16.9 (62.4)	8.0 (46.4)	38.7 (101.7)
Mean daily maximum °C (°F)	−12.6 (9.3)	−6.8 (19.8)	2.8 (37.0)	13.6 (56.5)	21.5 (70.7)	26.4 (79.5)	28.0 (82.4)	26.7 (80.1)	21.6 (70.9)	12.5 (54.5)	−0.2 (31.6)	−10.8 (12.6)	10.2 (50.4)
Daily mean °C (°F)	−18.4 (−1.1)	−13.2 (8.2)	−3.2 (26.2)	7.4 (45.3)	15.5 (59.9)	21.0 (69.8)	23.4 (74.1)	21.7 (71.1)	15.4 (59.7)	6.3 (43.3)	−5.3 (22.5)	−16.0 (3.2)	4.6 (40.2)
Mean daily minimum °C (°F)	−23.7 (−10.7)	−19.4 (−2.9)	−9.1 (15.6)	1.0 (33.8)	9.1 (48.4)	15.6 (60.1)	18.9 (66.0)	17.2 (63.0)	9.7 (49.5)	0.8 (33.4)	−10 (14)	−20.9 (−5.6)	−0.9 (30.4)
Record low °C (°F)	−35.6 (−32.1)	−33.3 (−27.9)	−28.9 (−20.0)	−10.1 (13.8)	−3.0 (26.6)	5.9 (42.6)	9.0 (48.2)	8.0 (46.4)	−1.0 (30.2)	−13.2 (8.2)	−28.8 (−19.8)	−34.2 (−29.6)	−35.6 (−32.1)
Average precipitation mm (inches)	3.6 (0.14)	3.3 (0.13)	8.6 (0.34)	19.5 (0.77)	52.5 (2.07)	93.2 (3.67)	143.8 (5.66)	99.7 (3.93)	58.4 (2.30)	21.5 (0.85)	12.3 (0.48)	6.4 (0.25)	522.8 (20.59)
Average precipitation days (≥ 0.1 mm)	4.6	3.4	5.1	6.5	10.8	13.2	14.2	12.0	9.5	5.7	5.5	6.3	96.8
Average snowy days	5.9	4.7	5.0	2.2	0.1	0.3	0.3	0.2	0.1	1.1	5.6	7.8	33.3
Average relative humidity (%)	73	67	57	50	53	66	78	79	72	63	66	73	66
Mean monthly sunshine hours	163.6	189.8	232.9	229.5	250.1	252.8	242.6	237.9	231.4	198.7	159.1	148.2	2,536.6
Percentage possible sunshine	58	65	63	56	54	54	51	55	62	60	57	55	58
Source: China Meteorological Administration

== See also ==
- Hulan River
- Tales of Hulan River, by Xiao Hong: a description of life in Hulan District, during the period 1910–1930.
