= Jixian County =

Jixian County 集贤县
- County
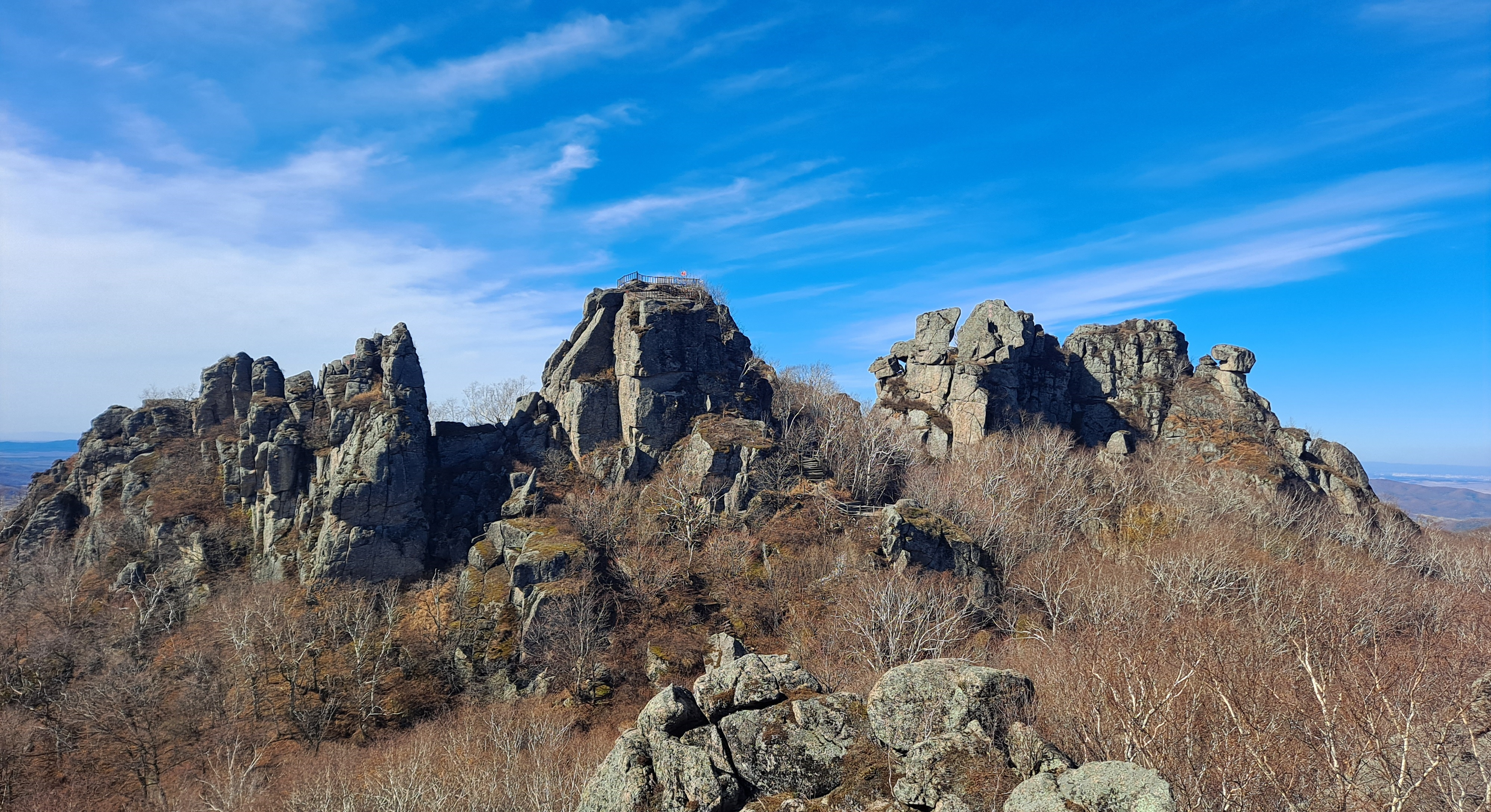
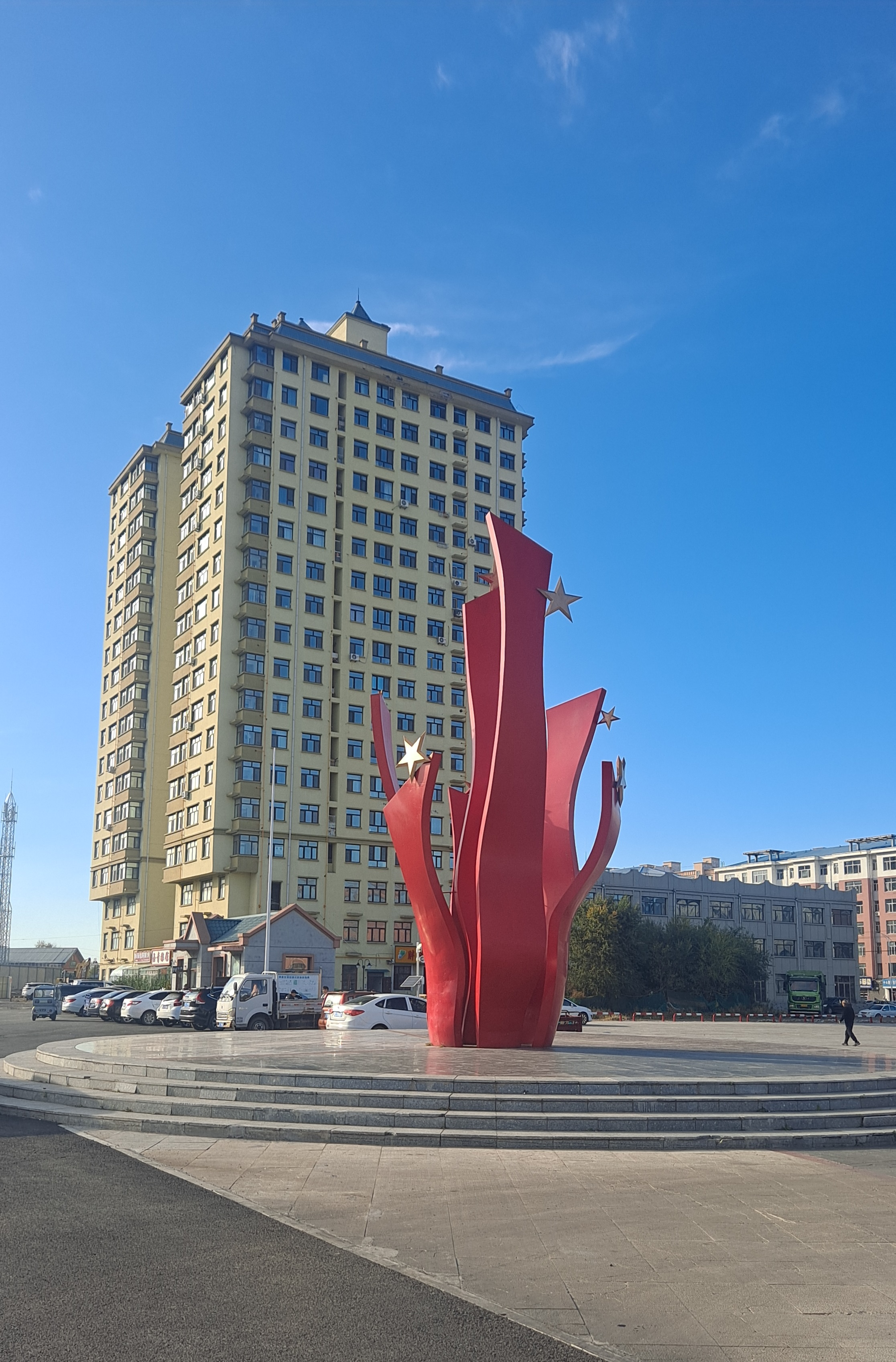
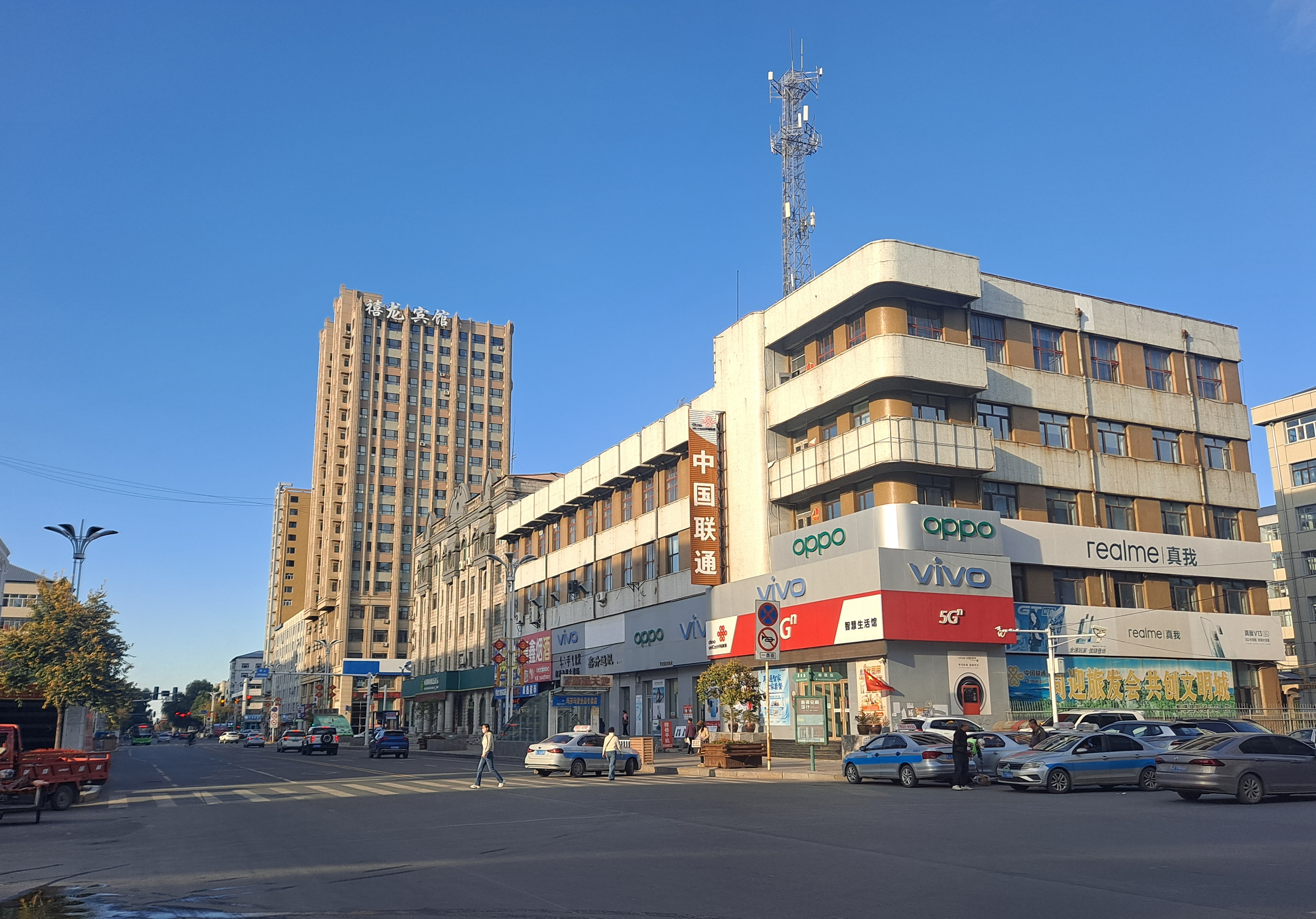
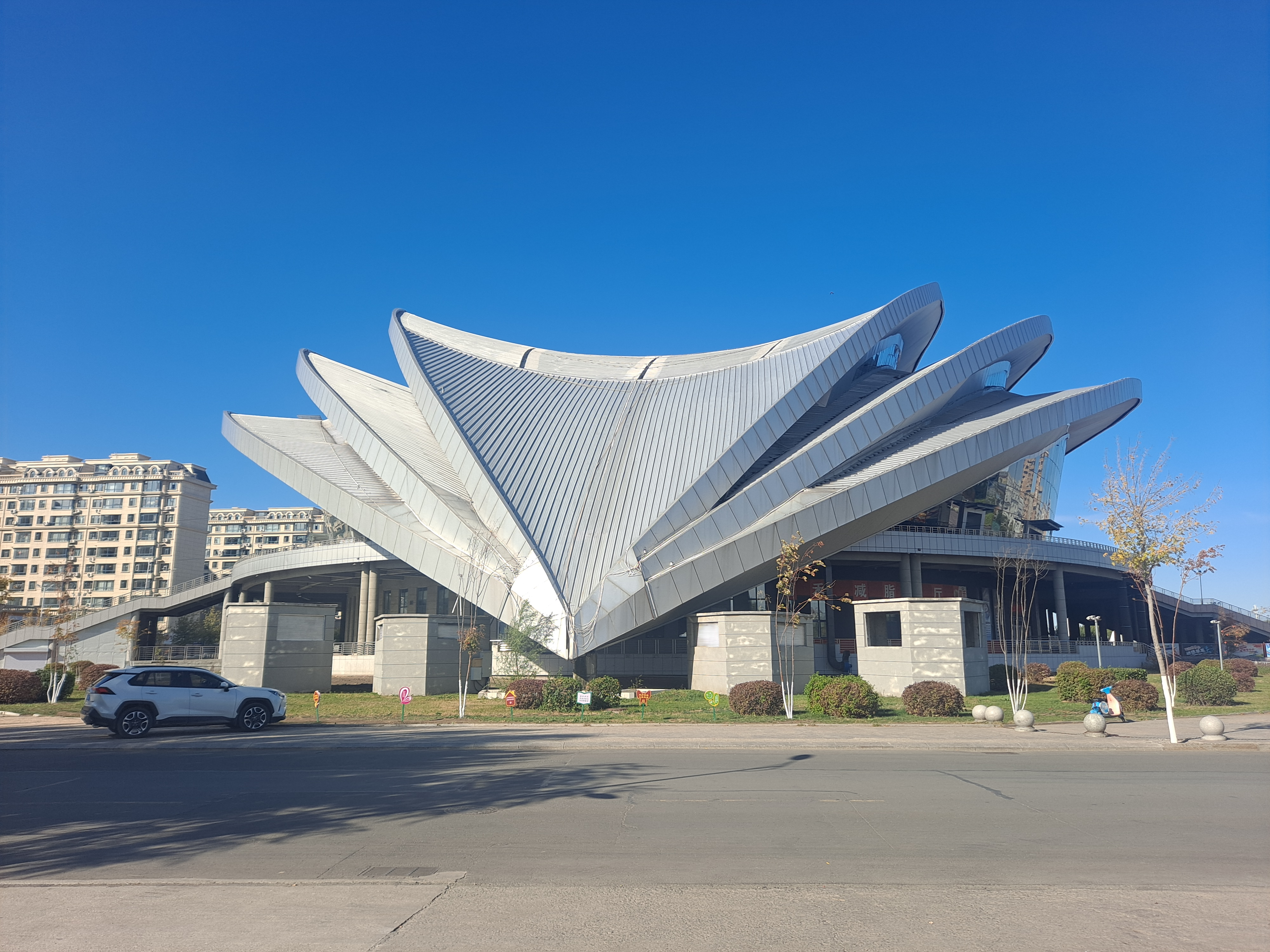
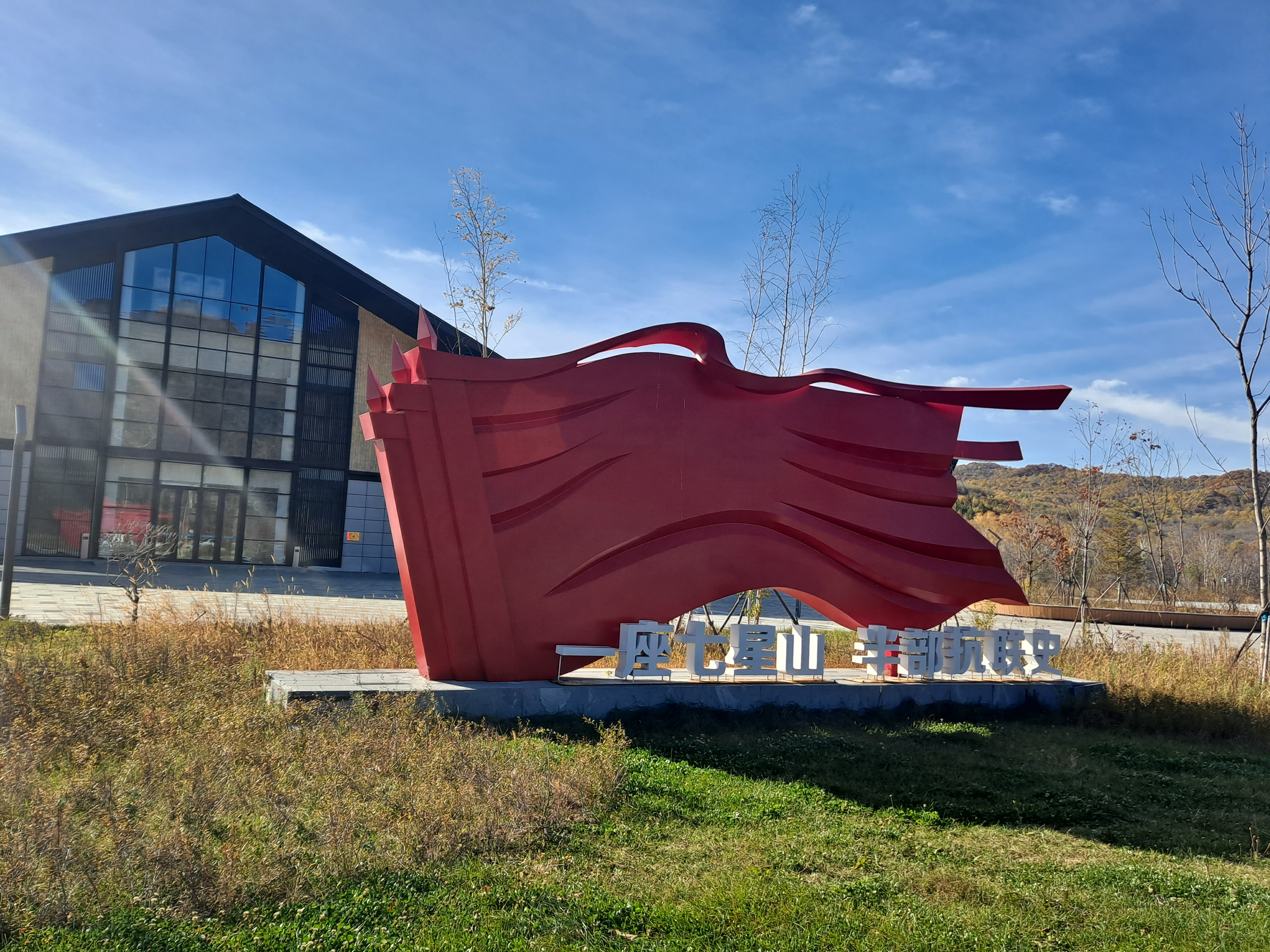
- Heilongjiang Qixingshan National Forest Park Fulitun Station Square Street view of Jixian County Qixing Square Qixingshan Northeast Anti-Japanese United Army Museum

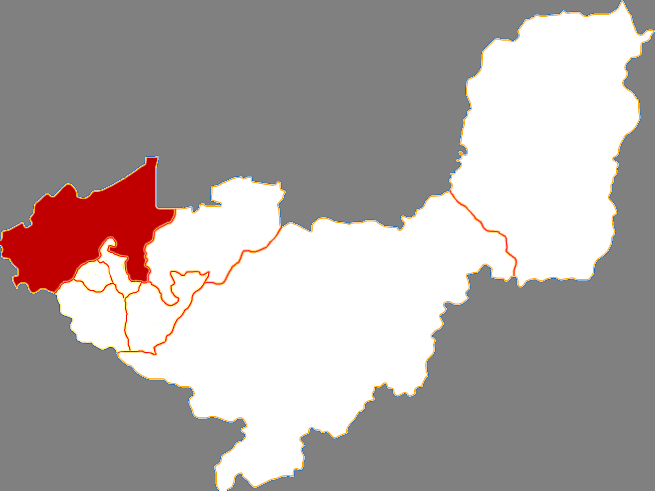

- Location in Heilongjiang
- Coordinates: 46.728°N 131.140°E
- Country: People's Republic of China
- Province: Heilongjiang
- Prefecture-level city: Shuangyashan

Area
  - Total: 2,860 km^{2} (1,100 sq mi)

Population (2003)
  - Total: 310,000
  - Density: 110/km^{2} (280/sq mi)
- Time zone: UTC+8 (China Standard)

Jixian County (simplified Chinese: 集贤县; traditional Chinese: 集賢縣; pinyin: Jíxián Xiàn) is a county of eastern Heilongjiang province, People's Republic of China. It is under the jurisdiction of the prefecture-level city of Shuangyashan.

== Administrative divisions ==
Jixian County is divided into 5 towns and 3 townships.

5 towns

- Fuli (福利镇), Jixian (集贤镇), Shengchang (升昌镇), Fengle (丰乐镇), Taiping (太平镇)

3 townships

- Yaotun (腰屯乡), Xing'an (兴安乡), Yong'an (永安乡)

== Demographics ==
The population of the district was 305,051 in 1999.

== Climate ==
Climate data for Jixian, elevation 102 m (335 ft), (1991–2020 normals, extremes 1981–2010)
Month	Jan	Feb	Mar	Apr	May	Jun	Jul	Aug	Sep	Oct	Nov	Dec	Year
Record high °C (°F)	3.9 (39.0)	9.2 (48.6)	18.6 (65.5)	30.8 (87.4)	33.1 (91.6)	36.9 (98.4)	38.6 (101.5)	34.7 (94.5)	32.5 (90.5)	26.6 (79.9)	17.2 (63.0)	7.1 (44.8)	38.6 (101.5)
Mean daily maximum °C (°F)	−11.8 (10.8)	−6.7 (19.9)	1.8 (35.2)	12.8 (55.0)	20.9 (69.6)	25.6 (78.1)	27.8 (82.0)	26.1 (79.0)	21.2 (70.2)	12.2 (54.0)	−0.5 (31.1)	−10.3 (13.5)	9.9 (49.9)
Daily mean °C (°F)	−16.6 (2.1)	−12.0 (10.4)	−3.3 (26.1)	7.1 (44.8)	15.0 (59.0)	20.2 (68.4)	23.1 (73.6)	21.2 (70.2)	15.4 (59.7)	6.8 (44.2)	−5.1 (22.8)	−14.7 (5.5)	4.8 (40.6)
Mean daily minimum °C (°F)	−21.0 (−5.8)	−17.4 (0.7)	−8.9 (16.0)	1.2 (34.2)	9.0 (48.2)	14.8 (58.6)	18.2 (64.8)	16.4 (61.5)	9.7 (49.5)	1.3 (34.3)	−9.7 (14.5)	−19.0 (−2.2)	−0.4 (31.2)
Record low °C (°F)	−35.1 (−31.2)	−30.2 (−22.4)	−26.1 (−15.0)	−12.3 (9.9)	−2.6 (27.3)	4.3 (39.7)	9.6 (49.3)	7.4 (45.3)	−2.9 (26.8)	−12.9 (8.8)	−25.4 (−13.7)	−33.0 (−27.4)	−35.1 (−31.2)
Average precipitation mm (inches)	6.8 (0.27)	4.8 (0.19)	14.2 (0.56)	26.2 (1.03)	57.1 (2.25)	88.2 (3.47)	118.9 (4.68)	114.7 (4.52)	63.1 (2.48)	32.1 (1.26)	15.3 (0.60)	10.8 (0.43)	552.2 (21.74)
Average precipitation days (≥ 0.1 mm)	6.3	4.8	7.1	8.0	11.9	13.6	13.3	13.4	10.1	7.5	6.7	8.5	111.2
Average snowy days	9.1	6.8	8.4	4.0	0.1	0	0	0	0	2.6	8.0	11.1	50.1
Average relative humidity (%)	67	61	55	51	55	67	75	78	70	59	60	67	64
Mean monthly sunshine hours	179.5	207.6	244.2	231.2	241.3	229.9	228.8	217.6	214.0	191.9	161.0	154.0	2,501
Percentage possible sunshine	64	71	66	57	52	49	48	50	57	58	58	58	57
Source: China Meteorological Administration
