= Jiansanjiang Shidi Airport =

Airport in Heilongjiang, China

Jiansanjiang Shidi Airport 建三江湿地机场
- IATA: JSJ; ICAO: ZYJS

Summary
- Airport type: Public
- Serves: Jiansanjiang, Heilongjiang
- Location: Fujin City
- Opened: 29 October 2017; 8 years ago
- Coordinates: 47°6′36″N 132°39′37″E

Map
- Location of airport in Heilongjiang

Runways
Direction	Length		Surface
Direction	m	ft	Surface
15/33	2,500	8,202

Statistics (2021)
- Passengers: 71,460
- Aircraft movements: 1,868

Jiansanjiang Shidi Airport
- Simplified Chinese: 建三江湿地机场
- Traditional Chinese: 建三江濕地機場
Transcriptions
Standard Mandarin
- Hanyu Pinyin: Jiànsānjiāng Shīdì Jīchǎng

Jiansanjiang Shidi Airport (IATA: JSJ, ICAO: ZYJS) is an airport serving Jiansanjiang in the southeast of Heilongjiang province. The airport received approval from the State Council of China and the Central Military Commission on 31 July 2013. It was opened on 29 October 2017.

== Etymology ==
The airport named "Shidi", a.k.a. "Wetland" in Chinese, is to indicate passengers can access five significant wetlands in Eastern Heilongjiang through the airport.

== Facilities ==
The airport has a 2,500-meter runway (class 4C) and a 3,000-square-meter terminal building. It is projected to handle 250,000 passengers and 1,250 tons of cargo annually by 2020.

== Airlines and destinations ==
Airlines	Destinations
Air China	Beijing–Capital, Harbin
Shandong Airlines	Dalian, Qingdao

Destinations map
Destinations from Jiansanjiang Shidi Airport

== See also ==
- List of airports in China
- List of the busiest airports in China
