= Fangzheng County =

Fangzheng County 方正县
- County
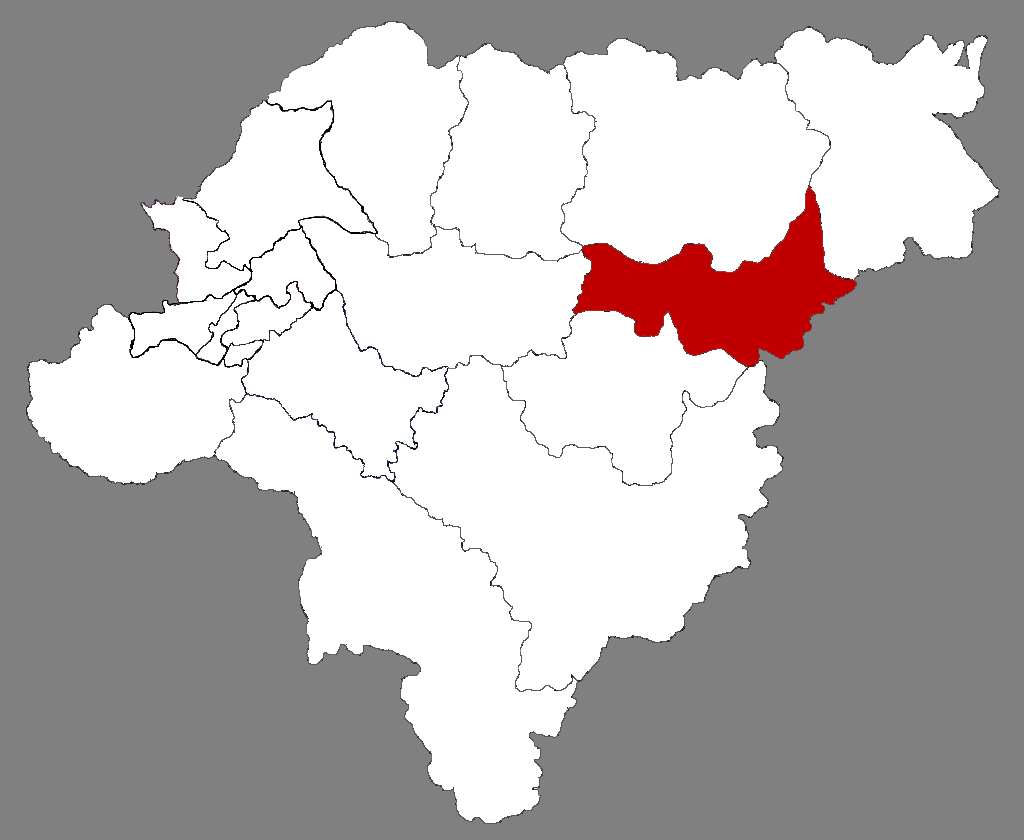
- Location of Fangzheng in Harbin

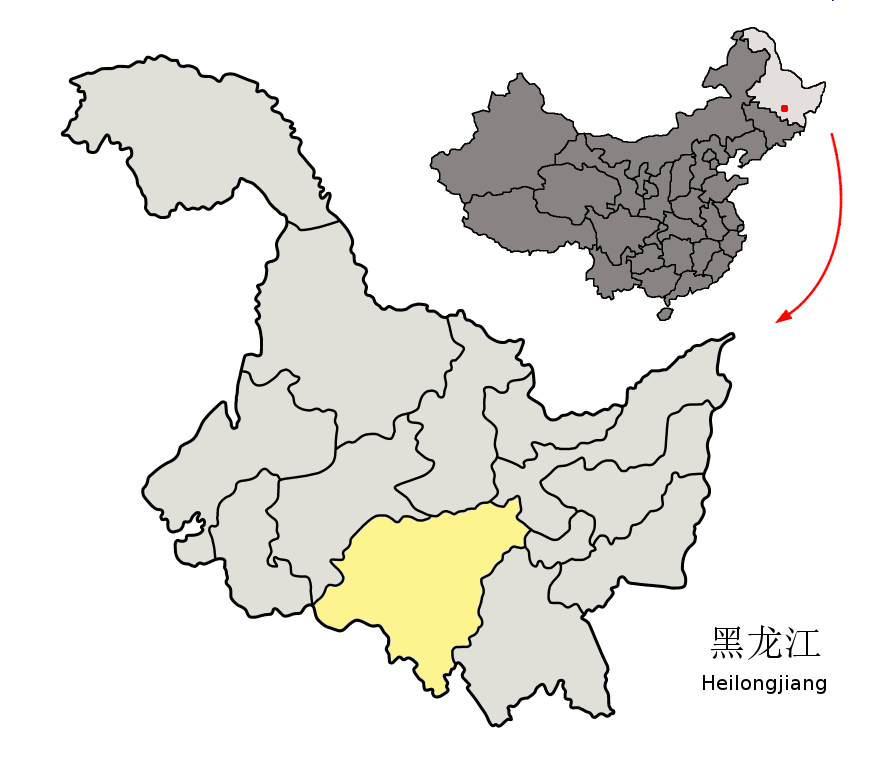
- Harbin in Heilongjiang
- Coordinates: 45°50′31″N 128°50′10″E
- Country: People's Republic of China
- Province: Heilongjiang
- Sub-provincial city: Harbin

Area
  - Total: 2,968.6 km^{2} (1,146.2 sq mi)

Population (2010)
  - Total: 203,853
  - Density: 68.670/km^{2} (177.85/sq mi)
- Time zone: UTC+8 (China Standard)
- Postal code: 1508XX
- Area code: 0451
- Website: hrbfz.gov.cn

Fangzheng County (simplified Chinese: 方正县; traditional Chinese: 方正縣; pinyin: Fāngzhèng Xiàn) is a county of Heilongjiang Province, Northeast China, under the administration of the prefecture-level city of Harbin, the capital of Heilongjiang. It borders Tonghe County to the north, Yilan County to the northeast, Yanshou County to the south, Bin County to the west, and Mulan County to the northwest, as well as the prefecture-level city of Mudanjiang to the northwest.

== Administrative divisions ==
Fangzheng County is divided into 4 towns and 4 townships.

4 towns

- Fangzheng (方正镇), Huifa (会发镇), Daluomi (大罗密镇), Demoli (得莫利镇)

4 townships

- Tianmen (天门乡), Songnan (松南乡), Deshan (德善乡), Baoxing (宝兴乡)

== Demographics ==
The population of the district was 230,000.

There are many descendants of Japanese settlers in Manchukuo.

== Climate ==
Climate data for Fangzheng, elevation 119 m (390 ft), (1991–2020 normals, extremes 1981–2010)
Month	Jan	Feb	Mar	Apr	May	Jun	Jul	Aug	Sep	Oct	Nov	Dec	Year
Record high °C (°F)	2.6 (36.7)	8.6 (47.5)	19.3 (66.7)	29.8 (85.6)	34.2 (93.6)	36.4 (97.5)	36.5 (97.7)	36.8 (98.2)	30.7 (87.3)	27.0 (80.6)	17.7 (63.9)	5.9 (42.6)	36.8 (98.2)
Mean daily maximum °C (°F)	−12.4 (9.7)	−6.5 (20.3)	2.5 (36.5)	13.3 (55.9)	20.8 (69.4)	25.6 (78.1)	27.8 (82.0)	26.3 (79.3)	21.3 (70.3)	12.1 (53.8)	−0.5 (31.1)	−10.6 (12.9)	10.0 (49.9)
Daily mean °C (°F)	−18.3 (−0.9)	−13.3 (8.1)	−3.6 (25.5)	6.6 (43.9)	14.3 (57.7)	19.9 (67.8)	22.8 (73.0)	21.0 (69.8)	14.7 (58.5)	5.9 (42.6)	−5.5 (22.1)	−15.7 (3.7)	4.1 (39.3)
Mean daily minimum °C (°F)	−23.4 (−10.1)	−19.3 (−2.7)	−9.3 (15.3)	0.9 (33.6)	8.5 (47.3)	15.1 (59.2)	18.6 (65.5)	16.8 (62.2)	9.3 (48.7)	0.9 (33.6)	−9.8 (14.4)	−20.1 (−4.2)	−1.0 (30.2)
Record low °C (°F)	−38.6 (−37.5)	−35.0 (−31.0)	−29.3 (−20.7)	−11.0 (12.2)	−4.2 (24.4)	4.9 (40.8)	11.7 (53.1)	7.5 (45.5)	−3.2 (26.2)	−16.3 (2.7)	−27.7 (−17.9)	−35.0 (−31.0)	−38.6 (−37.5)
Average precipitation mm (inches)	6.7 (0.26)	6.2 (0.24)	15.1 (0.59)	26.7 (1.05)	67.0 (2.64)	92.5 (3.64)	140.8 (5.54)	132.6 (5.22)	62.2 (2.45)	37.8 (1.49)	18.6 (0.73)	11.3 (0.44)	617.5 (24.29)
Average precipitation days (≥ 0.1 mm)	7.6	5.3	7.7	8.5	12.6	14.5	14.0	13.7	10.1	8.7	7.9	9.3	119.9
Average snowy days	10.5	7.3	9.8	3.2	0.1	0	0	0	0	3.2	9.4	12.4	55.9
Average relative humidity (%)	73	68	63	60	65	74	81	83	78	69	69	73	71
Mean monthly sunshine hours	137.8	170.2	215.3	209.9	227.6	232.7	221.1	207.3	209.5	167.3	131.0	118.2	2,247.9
Percentage possible sunshine	49	58	58	52	49	50	47	48	56	50	47	44	51
Source: China Meteorological Administration
