= Fujin City =

Fujin 富锦市
- County-level city
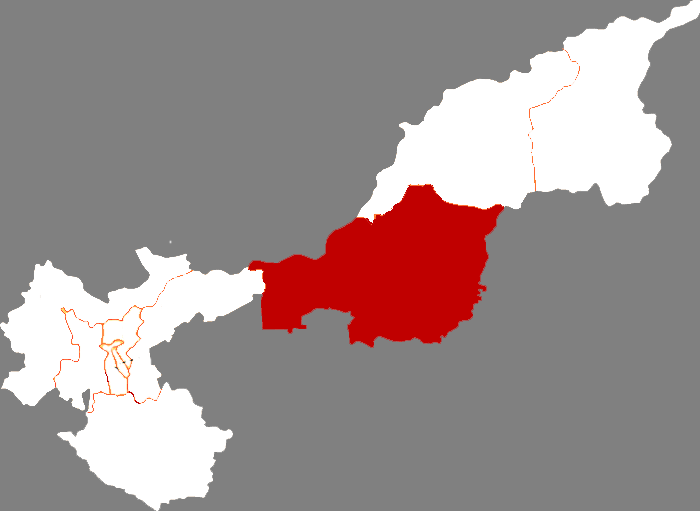
- Location in Jiamusi

- Location in Heilongjiang
- Coordinates: 47°15′N 132°2′E
- Country: People's Republic of China
- Province: Heilongjiang
- Prefecture-level city: Jiamusi

Area
  - Total: 8,227 km^{2} (3,176 sq mi)
- Elevation: 62 m (203 ft)

Population (2019)
  - Total: 452,379
  - Density: 54.99/km^{2} (142.4/sq mi)
- Time zone: UTC+8 (China Standard)
- Postal code: 156100
- Area code: 0454
- Climate: Dwb
- Website: fujin.gov.cn

Fujin (simplified Chinese: 富锦; traditional Chinese: 富錦; pinyin: Fùjǐn) is a county-level city in the east of Heilongjiang province, People's Republic of China. It is under the jurisdiction of the prefecture-level city of Jiamusi.

== Administrative divisions ==
Fujin City is divided into 2 subdistricts and 11 towns.

2 subdistricts

- Chengdong (城东街道), Chengxi (城西街道)

11 towns

- Fujin (富锦镇), Chang'an (长安镇), Yanshan (砚山镇), Toulin (头林镇), Xinglonggang (兴隆岗镇), Hongsheng (宏胜镇), Xiangyangchuan (向阳川镇), Erlongshan (二龙山镇), Shangjieji (上街基镇), Jinshan (锦山镇), Dayushu (大榆树镇)

== Demographics ==
The population of the district was 424,491 in 1999.

31163-013: Wind Power Development Project: The scope of the Project comprises (i) construction of wind farms at Dabancheng in the Xinjiang Autonomous Region (30 MW); at Fujin in Heilongjiang Province (24 MW); and at Xiwaizi in Liaoning Province (24 MW); and (ii) technical assistance for Barrier Removal and Institutional Strengthening to promote wind-based power generation in the three provinces. http://adb.org/projects/31163-013/details

== Climate ==
Fujin has a humid continental climate (Köppen Dwa), with long, bitterly cold, but dry winters, and humid, very warm summers. The monthly daily mean temperature in January, the coldest month, is −19.0 °C (−2.2 °F), and July, the warmest month, averages 22.2 °C (72.0 °F), with an average annual temperature +3.37 °C (38.1 °F). Close to three-fifths of the annual precipitation falls from June to August. With monthly percent possible sunshine ranging from 46% in the three summer months to 70% in February, there are 2,408 hours of bright sunshine annually.

Climate data for Fujin City, elevation 66 m (217 ft), (1991–2020 normals, extremes 1952–present)
Month	Jan	Feb	Mar	Apr	May	Jun	Jul	Aug	Sep	Oct	Nov	Dec	Year
Record high °C (°F)	1.7 (35.1)	9.2 (48.6)	20.5 (68.9)	31.7 (89.1)	34.4 (93.9)	37.8 (100.0)	38.9 (102.0)	36.3 (97.3)	32.2 (90.0)	27.8 (82.0)	16.1 (61.0)	6.6 (43.9)	38.9 (102.0)
Mean daily maximum °C (°F)	−13.8 (7.2)	−8.5 (16.7)	0.5 (32.9)	11.7 (53.1)	19.9 (67.8)	24.8 (76.6)	27.0 (80.6)	25.3 (77.5)	20.5 (68.9)	11.2 (52.2)	−2.0 (28.4)	−12.4 (9.7)	8.7 (47.6)
Daily mean °C (°F)	−18.6 (−1.5)	−14.2 (6.4)	−4.8 (23.4)	5.9 (42.6)	14.0 (57.2)	19.5 (67.1)	22.3 (72.1)	20.6 (69.1)	14.7 (58.5)	5.7 (42.3)	−6.5 (20.3)	−16.7 (1.9)	3.5 (38.3)
Mean daily minimum °C (°F)	−22.8 (−9.0)	−19.6 (−3.3)	−10.2 (13.6)	0.3 (32.5)	8.3 (46.9)	14.6 (58.3)	18.0 (64.4)	16.4 (61.5)	9.5 (49.1)	0.7 (33.3)	−10.8 (12.6)	−20.7 (−5.3)	−1.4 (29.6)
Record low °C (°F)	−37.8 (−36.0)	−34.1 (−29.4)	−27.6 (−17.7)	−12.9 (8.8)	−3.7 (25.3)	3.6 (38.5)	7.5 (45.5)	6.2 (43.2)	−3.1 (26.4)	−15.5 (4.1)	−27.7 (−17.9)	−35.2 (−31.4)	−37.8 (−36.0)
Average precipitation mm (inches)	5.9 (0.23)	5.5 (0.22)	14.3 (0.56)	24.8 (0.98)	59.0 (2.32)	81.7 (3.22)	117.1 (4.61)	106.4 (4.19)	66.1 (2.60)	30.8 (1.21)	15.5 (0.61)	10.5 (0.41)	537.6 (21.16)
Average precipitation days (≥ 0.1 mm)	5.7	4.7	6.6	8.0	12.3	12.7	13.1	12.9	10.2	8.2	6.4	7.7	108.5
Average snowy days	7.9	6.4	7.9	4.0	0.1	0	0	0	0	2.4	7.8	9.9	46.4
Average relative humidity (%)	70	66	63	59	61	71	79	82	74	64	66	71	69
Mean monthly sunshine hours	178.1	205.8	247.1	221.4	226.7	215.7	212.1	207.1	215.1	193.3	161.1	156.7	2,440.2
Percentage possible sunshine	64	71	67	54	49	46	45	47	58	58	58	60	56
Source: China Meteorological Administration extremes
