= Longtou =

Longtou (龙头) may refer to the following locations in China:

Towns

- Longtou, Guangdong
- Longtou, Liucheng County, Guangxi
- Longtou, Heilongjiang
- Longtou, Shaanxi, in Chenggu County
- Longtou, Sichuan, in Changning County

Townships

- Longtou Township, Fusui County, Guangxi
- Longtou Township, Yizhou, Guangxi
