= Deng Zongquan =

Chinese scientist

- 邓宗全
- Born: 2 October 1956 (age 69); Baoqing County, Heilongjiang, China
- Education: Harbin Institute of Technology
- Scientific career
- Fields: Aerospace mechanism
- Workplaces: Harbin Institute of Technology

Chinese name
- Simplified Chinese: 邓宗全
- Traditional Chinese: 鄧宗全
Transcriptions
Standard Mandarin
- Hanyu Pinyin: Dèng Zōngquán

Deng Zongquan (born 2 October 1956) is a Chinese scientist who is a professor at Harbin Institute of Technology. He is an academician of the Chinese Academy of Engineering (CAE).

== Biography ==
Deng was born in Baoqing County, Heilongjiang, on 2 October 1956. After graduating from Harbin Institute of Technology in 1984, he stayed at the university and worked as instructor, director of the Department of Mechanical Engineering (1993–1998), dean of the College of Mechanical and Electrical Engineering (1998–2004), and vice president of the university (2004–2016). In September 2017, he was appointed director of the National Defense Key Laboratory of Aerospace Institutions and Control. On 6 December 2017, he became a member of the Standing Committee of the 14th Central Committee of China Association for Promoting Democracy.

== Contributions ==
Deng is one of the earliest scientists engaged in lunar rover research in China, and participated in the development of "Chang'e-2" and "Chang'e-3". He has made great contributions to the institutional innovation and application of China's lunar exploration project, deep space exploration, large space folding mechanism and model weapons.

== Honours and awards ==
- 1999 State Science and Technology Progress Award (Third Class) for research and application of in pipe mobile robot technology
- 2011 State Technological Invention Award (Second Class) for key technologies of lunar rover mobile system
- 2014 State Technological Invention Award (Second Class) for key technologies of spatial unfolding and locking mechanism
- November 27, 2017 2017 Member of the Chinese Academy of Engineering (CAE)
