= Zhu Zhongkui =

Chinese politician

- 朱中奎

Communist Party Secretary of Ngari Prefecture
- In office January 2017 – 30 September 2021
- Preceded by: Baima Wangdui
- Succeeded by: Duan Hai

Governor of Ngari Prefecture
- In office July 2015 – January 2017
- Preceded by: Baima Wangdui
- Succeeded by: Peng Cuo

Personal details
- Born: April 1963 (age 63) Changning County, Sichuan, China
- Party: Chinese Communist Party (1986–2022; expelled)
- Education: Central Party School of the Chinese Communist Party

Zhu Zhongkui (Chinese: 朱中奎; pinyin: Zhū Zhōngkuí; born April 1963) is a former Chinese politician. He surrendered himself to China's top anti-graft agency in October 2021. Previously he served as party secretary of Ngari Prefecture. He was a representative of the 19th National Congress of the Chinese Communist Party.

== Biography ==
Zhu was born in Changning County, Sichuan, in April 1963. He was an accountant in Jomda County Finance Bureau in November 1982 and rose to become its director in June 1987. He joined the Chinese Communist Party (CCP) in March 1986. In December 1993, he was assigned to the Chamdo Office of Changdu Prefectural Government, where he was promoted to deputy director in January 1995. He also served as deputy general manager of Chamdo Prefectural Economic and Trade Development Corporation. He was appointed deputy party branch secretary of Chamdo Prefectural Finance Bureau in November 2001, concurrently holding the director position since April 2002. In June 2007, he became deputy deputy secretary-general of the CCP Chamdo Prefectural Committee, rising to secretary-general in April 2008. He was appointed head of the Organization Department of the CCP Chamdo Prefectural Committee in November 2007 and was admitted to member of the Standing Committee of the CCP Chamdo Prefectural Committee, the prefecture's top authority.

In February 2014, he was promoted to deputy secretary-general of the CCP Tibet Autonomous Regional Party Committee.

He became governor of Ngari Prefecture in January 2017, and then party secretary, the top political position in the prefecture, beginning in January 2017. He was laid off on 30 September 2021.

=== Downfall ===
On 13 October 2021, he handed himself in and was cooperating with the Central Commission for Discipline Inspection (CCDI) and National Commission of Supervision for investigation of "suspected violations of disciplines and laws".

On 23 April 2022, he was expelled from the CCP and dismissed from public office. He was detained by the People's Procuratorate of Tibet Autonomous Region on April 27. On May 23, he was indicted on suspicion of accepting bribes.

Government offices
Preceded by Baima Wangdui	Governor of Ngari Prefecture; 2015–2017	Succeeded by Peng Cuo
Party political offices
Preceded by Baima Wangdui	Communist Party Secretary of Ngari Prefecture; 2017–2021	Succeeded by Duan Hai
