= Yao Di =

Yao Di is the name of:

- Yao Di (actress) (born 1982), Chinese actress
- Yao Di (volleyball) (born 1992), Chinese volleyball player

== See also ==
- Emperor Yao (帝堯; Dì Yáo), mythological ruler of ancient China
- Yaodi Subdistrict (窑地街道), a subdistrict in Jianshan District, Yashan, Heilongjiang, China
