= Baoqing =

Baoqing may refer to:

- Baoqing Prefecture, former name of Shaoyang, Hunan, China
  - Baoqing era (1225–1227), an era name of Emperor Lizong of Song, after which the prefecture was named
- Baoqing County, Heilongjiang, China
  - Baoqing Town, the seat of Baoqing County
