= Longtou, Heilongjiang =

Longtou 龙头镇
- Town
- Location in Heilongjiang Longtou (China)
- Coordinates: 46°07′53″N 132°05′51″E
- Country: People's Republic of China
- Province: Heilongjiang
- Prefecture-level city: Shuangyashan
- County: Baoqing
- Elevation: 119 m (390 ft)
- Time zone: UTC+8 (China Standard)

Longtou (simplified Chinese: 龙头; traditional Chinese: 龍頭; pinyin: Lóngtóu; lit. 'dragon head (faucet)') is a town in Baoqing County, in southeastern Heilongjiang province, China. As of 2011, it has 10 villages under its administration. The town is located about 23 kilometres (14 mi) south-southwest of the county seat, Baoqing Town (宝清镇) and more than 90 km (56 mi) southeast of Shuangyashan city proper.

== See also ==
- List of township-level divisions of Heilongjiang
