= Shuangyashan =

Shuangyashan 双鸭山市
- Prefecture-level city
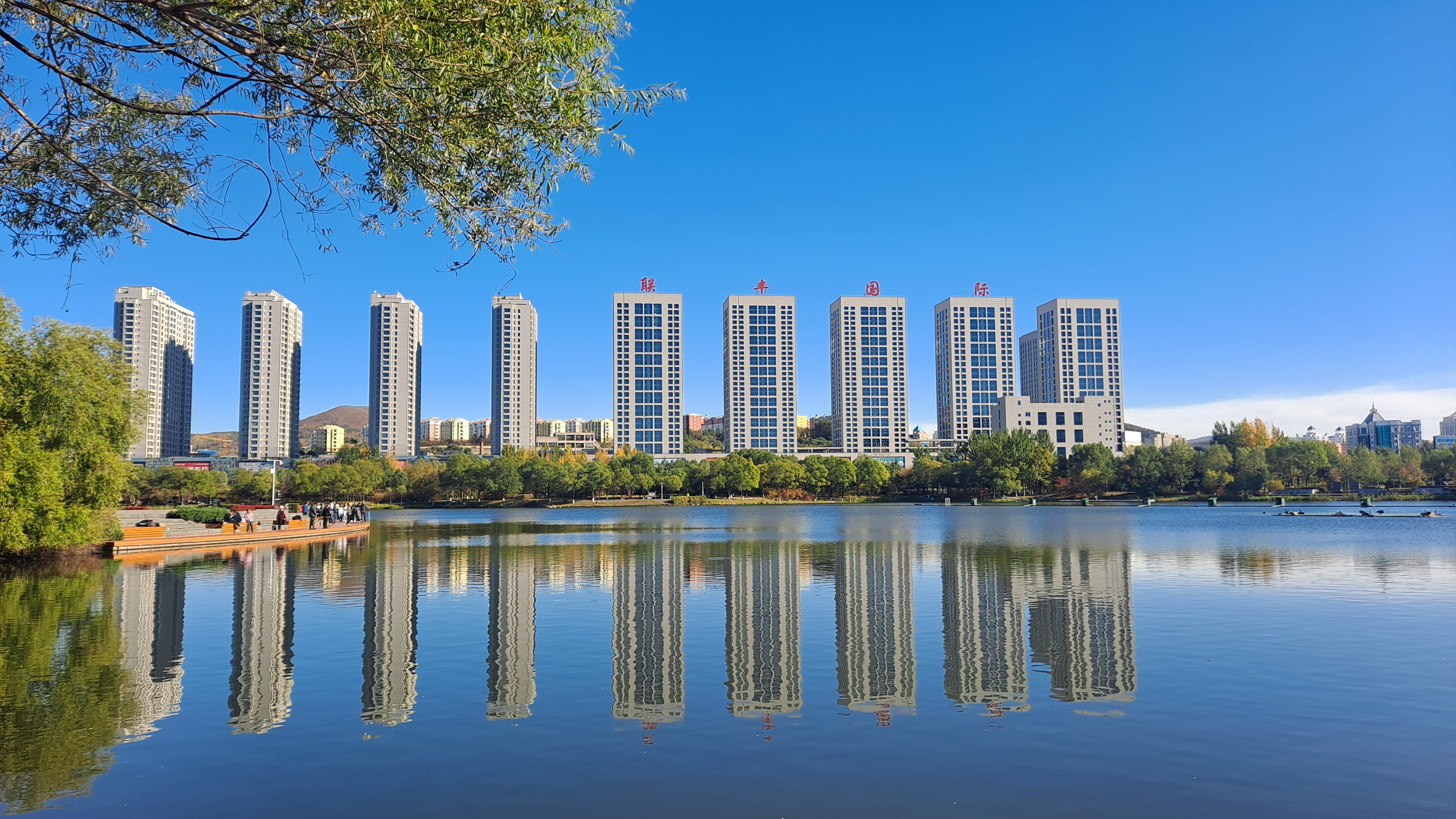
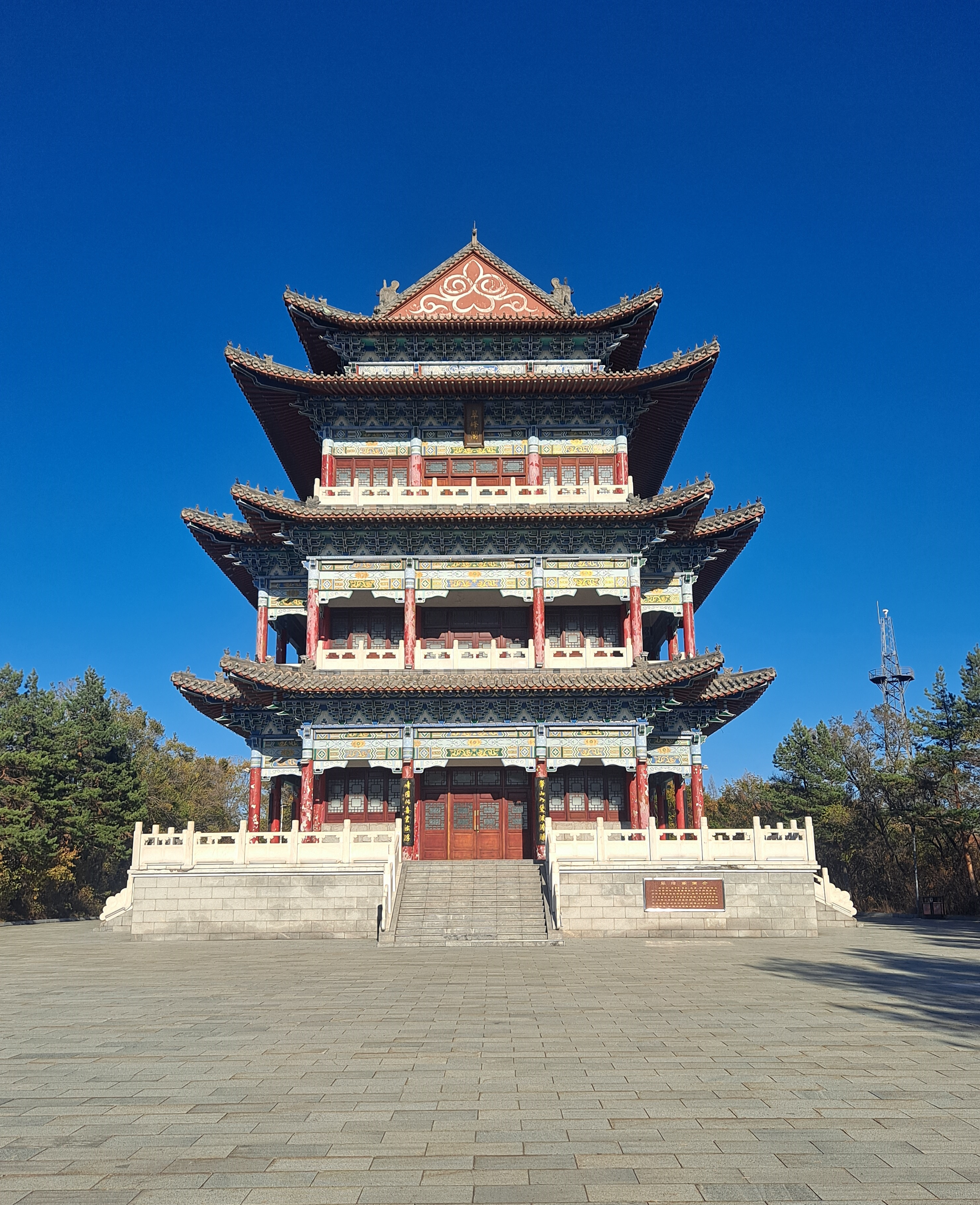
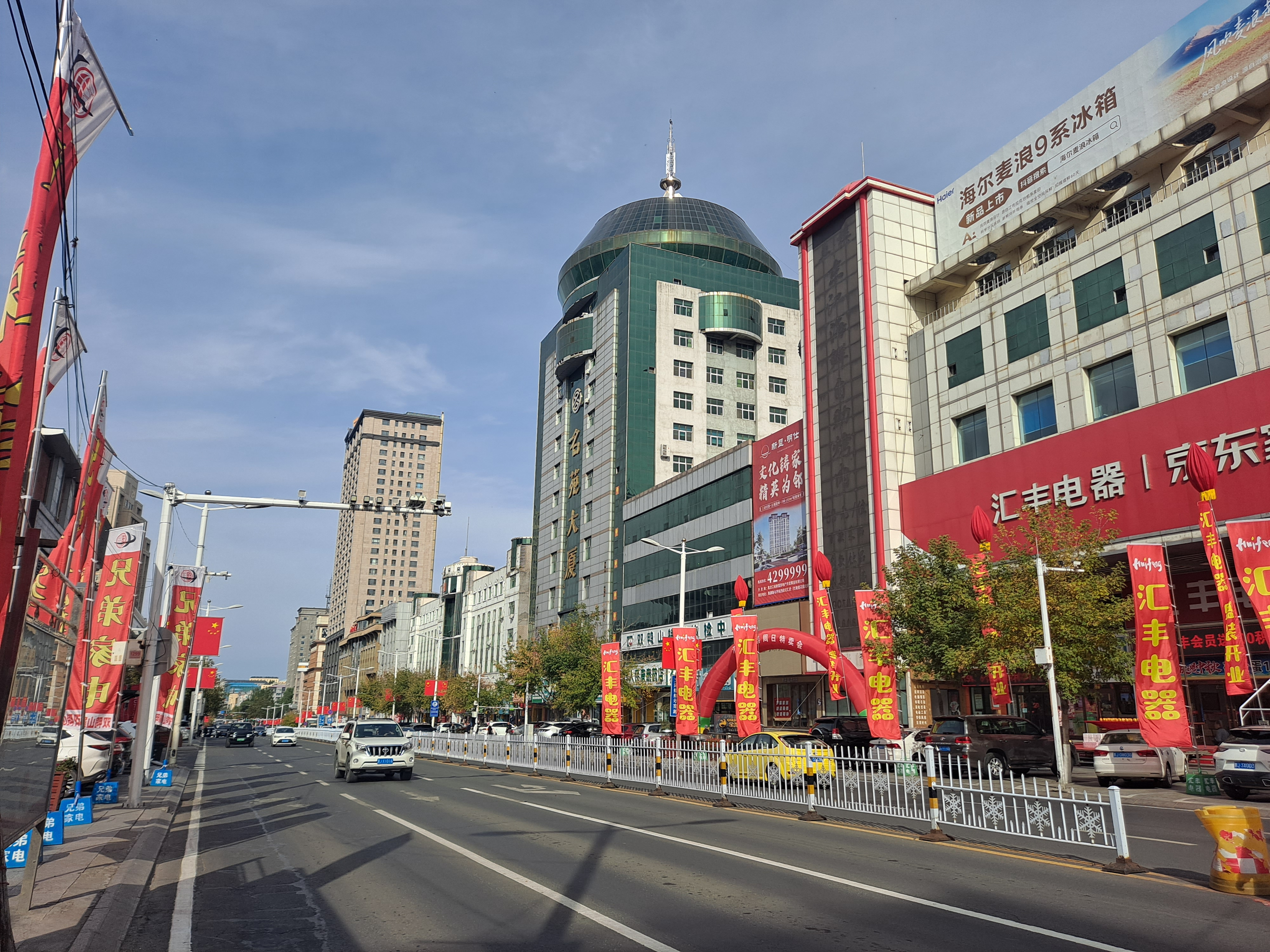
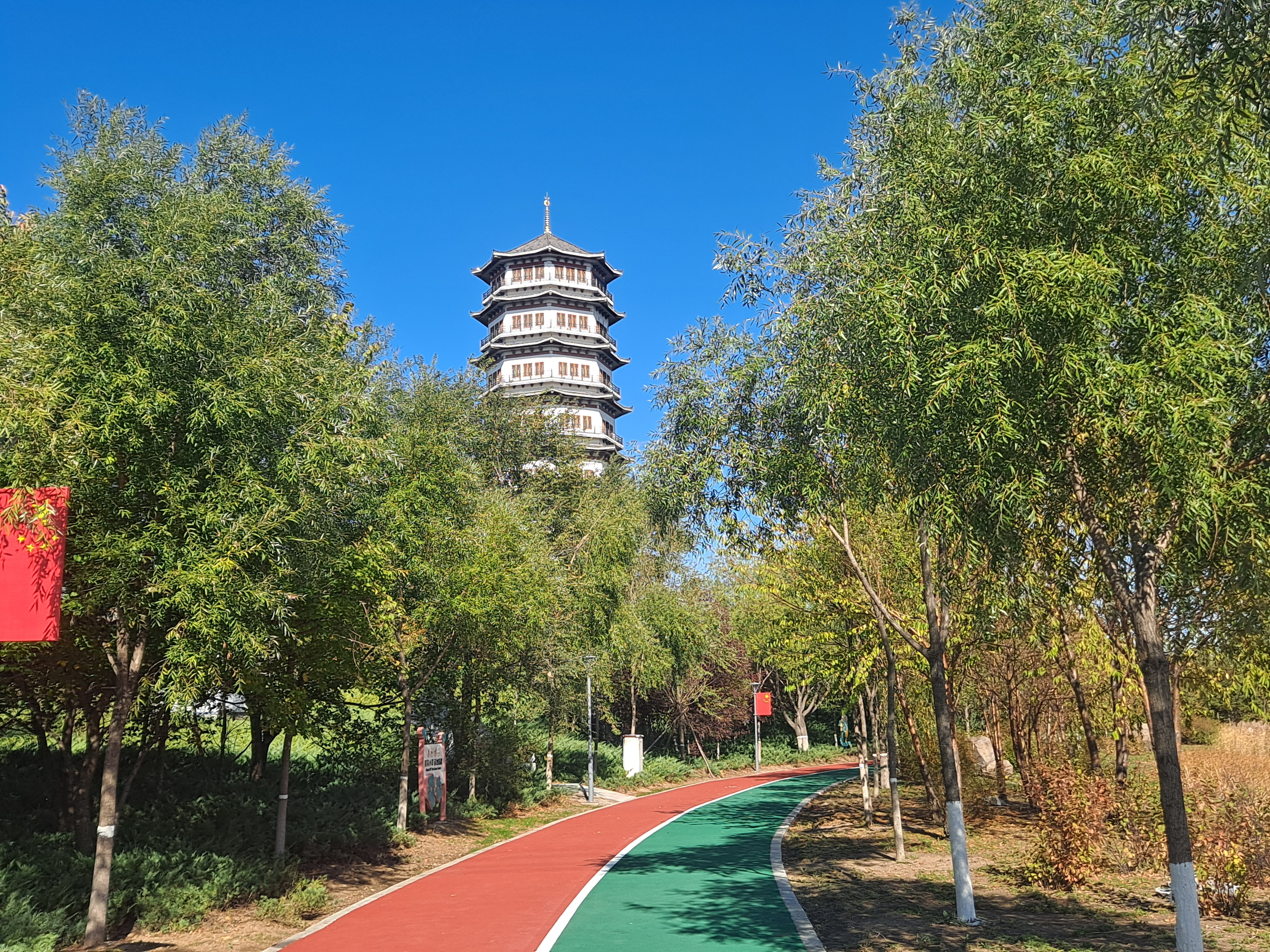
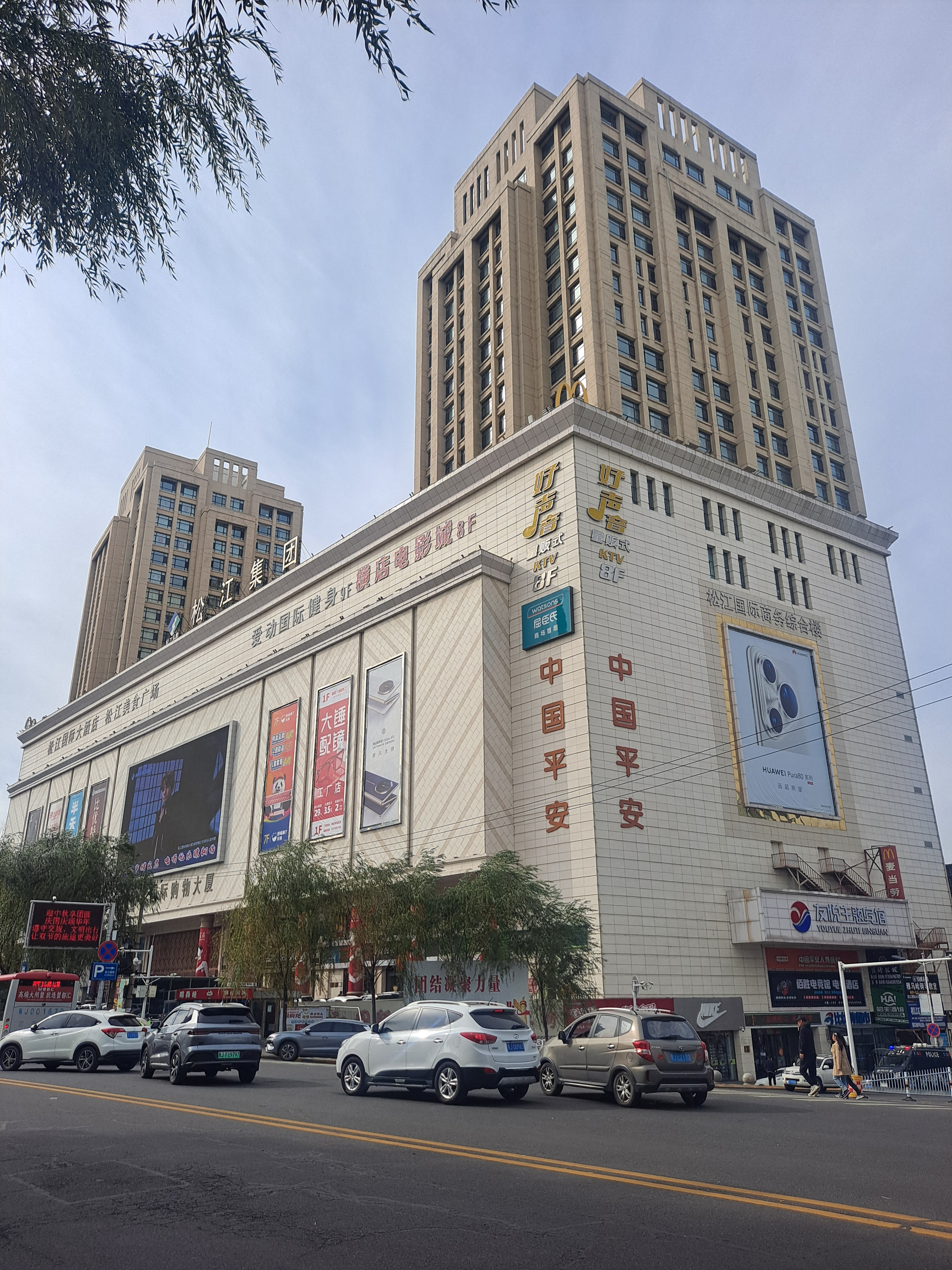
- Civic Square Cuifeng Pavilion Xinxing Avenue Chengping Lake Park Songjiang Shopping Mall

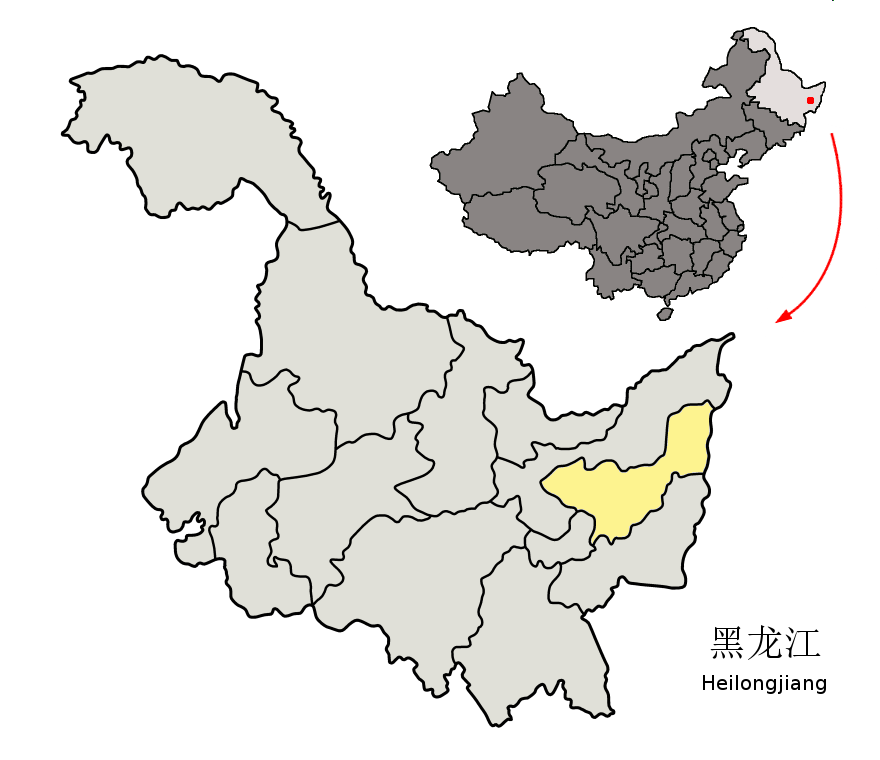
- Location of Shuangyashan City (yellow) in Heilongjiang (light grey) and China

- Location of the city centre in Heilongjiang
- Coordinates (Shuangyashan municipal government): 46°40′34″N 131°08′30″E
- Country: People's Republic of China
- Province: Heilongjiang
- County-level divisions: 8
- Municipal seat: Jianshan District

Government
  - Type: Prefecture-level city
  - CPC Shuangyashan Secretary: Li Xiangang (李显刚)
  - Mayor: Wu Fengcheng (武凤呈)

Area
  - Prefecture-level city: 26,483 km^{2} (10,225 sq mi)

Population (2010)
  - Prefecture-level city: 1,462,626
  - Urban: 507,257

GDP
  - Prefecture-level city: CN¥ 43.3 billion US$ 7.0 billion
  - Per capita: CN¥ 29,235; US$ 4,694
- Time zone: UTC+8 (China Standard)
- Postal code: 155000
- Area code: 0469
- ISO 3166 code: CN-HL-05
- Licence plates: 黑J
- Climate: Dwb

Shuangyashan
- "Shuangyashan", as written in Chinese

Chinese name
- Simplified Chinese: 双鸭山
- Traditional Chinese: 雙鴨山
- Literal meaning: double duck mountain
Transcriptions
Standard Mandarin
- Hanyu Pinyin: Shuāngyāshān

Manchu name
- Manchu script: ᡧᡠᠸᠠᠩ ᠶᠠ ᡧᠠᠨ ᡥᠣᡨᠣᠨ ᠵᡠᡵᡠ ᠨᡳᠶᡝᡥᡝ ᠠᠯᡳᠨ ᡥᠣᡨᠣᠨ
- Romanization: Shuwang'ya'shan hoton/Juru'niyehe'alin hoton

Russian name
- Russian: Шуанъяшань

Shuangyashan (simplified Chinese: 双鸭山; traditional Chinese: 雙鴨山; pinyin: Shuāngyāshān) is a coal mining prefecture-level city located in the eastern part of Heilongjiang province, People's Republic of China, bordering Russia's Khabarovsk and Primorsky Krais to the east. The city's name means a pair-of-ducks mountains and refers to two peaks northeast of the city. In 2007 the city had a GDP of RMB 20.6 billion with a 14.2% growth rate. At the end of 2024, the total registered population was 1,336,100, including 850,300 in urban areas and 485,800 in rural areas.

== History ==
Shuangyashan was given its name in AD 1384 during the Ming Dynasty. However, few people lived in the area before coal was discovered there in 1914. In 1928, a major coal mining operation was established on the site, and in 1946 the area was first designated a county. Shuangyashan was established as a special mining district in 1954 and officially designated a city by the CPC Central Committee and State Council in 1956.

== Geography and climate ==
=== Resources ===
Shuangyashan is rich in coal, magnetite and marble. The proven coal reserves in the city total 11 billion tons, ranking first out of 13 prefecture-level divisions in the province. The magnetite reserves in Shuangyashan exceed 120 million tons, ranking first in Heilongjiang Province.

=== Climate ===
The city has a cold temperate monsoon climate, with long, cold, windy winters. The annual mean temperature in the city is 4.46 °C (40.0 °F).

Climate data for Shuangyashan, elevation 175 m (574 ft), (1991–2020 normals, extremes 1981–2010)
Month	Jan	Feb	Mar	Apr	May	Jun	Jul	Aug	Sep	Oct	Nov	Dec	Year
Record high °C (°F)	2.9 (37.2)	10.4 (50.7)	20.4 (68.7)	29.9 (85.8)	33.8 (92.8)	37.2 (99.0)	38.2 (100.8)	37.3 (99.1)	32.2 (90.0)	27.6 (81.7)	16.8 (62.2)	5.7 (42.3)	38.2 (100.8)
Mean daily maximum °C (°F)	−11.4 (11.5)	−6.4 (20.5)	1.8 (35.2)	12.4 (54.3)	20.4 (68.7)	25.2 (77.4)	27.7 (81.9)	26.1 (79.0)	21.0 (69.8)	11.9 (53.4)	−0.7 (30.7)	−10.1 (13.8)	9.8 (49.7)
Daily mean °C (°F)	−16.1 (3.0)	−11.4 (11.5)	−3.1 (26.4)	7.0 (44.6)	14.6 (58.3)	19.7 (67.5)	22.9 (73.2)	21.2 (70.2)	15.3 (59.5)	6.7 (44.1)	−4.9 (23.2)	−14.3 (6.3)	4.8 (40.7)
Mean daily minimum °C (°F)	−19.5 (−3.1)	−15.7 (3.7)	−7.7 (18.1)	1.8 (35.2)	9.0 (48.2)	14.6 (58.3)	18.4 (65.1)	17.0 (62.6)	10.5 (50.9)	2.2 (36.0)	−8.5 (16.7)	−17.5 (0.5)	0.4 (32.7)
Record low °C (°F)	−32.8 (−27.0)	−30.9 (−23.6)	−23.2 (−9.8)	−10.3 (13.5)	−1.9 (28.6)	3.5 (38.3)	9.6 (49.3)	7.8 (46.0)	−1.8 (28.8)	−13.1 (8.4)	−26.4 (−15.5)	−30.2 (−22.4)	−32.8 (−27.0)
Average precipitation mm (inches)	8.0 (0.31)	5.5 (0.22)	17.3 (0.68)	29.3 (1.15)	57.8 (2.28)	81.4 (3.20)	126.3 (4.97)	117.1 (4.61)	61.3 (2.41)	34.1 (1.34)	18.5 (0.73)	11.9 (0.47)	568.5 (22.37)
Average precipitation days (≥ 0.1 mm)	6.9	5.0	7.9	8.9	12.3	14.0	13.5	14.3	10.4	7.7	7.0	8.1	116
Average snowy days	11.3	8.5	11.6	5.4	0.3	0	0	0	0	3.5	10.0	13.0	63.6
Average relative humidity (%)	65	58	52	49	56	68	74	77	68	56	58	65	62
Mean monthly sunshine hours	178.0	199.0	248.3	250.8	255.7	246.2	244.1	227.7	231.2	190.7	164.2	154.9	2,590.8
Percentage possible sunshine	64	68	67	61	55	52	52	52	62	57	59	58	59
Source: China Meteorological Administration

== Administrative divisions ==
#	Name	Hanzi	Hanyu Pinyin	Population (2003 est.)	Area (km^{2})	Density (/km^{2})
1	Jianshan District	尖山区	Jiānshān Qū	210,000	118	1,780
3	Lingdong District	岭东区	Lǐngdōng Qū	90,000	908	99
2	Sifangtai District	四方台区	Sìfāngtái Qū	70,000	169	414
4	Baoshan District	宝山区	Bǎoshān Qū	130,000	572	227
5	Jixian County	集贤县	Jíxián Xiàn	310,000	2,860	108
6	Youyi County	友谊县	Yǒuyì Xiàn	120,000	1,800	67
7	Baoqing County	宝清县	Bǎoqīng Xiàn	420,000	13,443	31
8	Raohe County	饶河县	Ráohé Xiàn	140,000	6,613	21

== Economy ==
Shuangyashan is a major center for coal mining. The city also produces steel, lumber, chemicals, building materials, textiles, electric machinery, and food products. In 2010, Shuangyashan's GDP reached RMB 37.67 billion, featuring a growth of 25% from a year ago. The production output of steel and coal ranked the first and the second in Heilongjiang province. The region has attracted investments from large domestic companies such as Shandong Luneng Group and Jianlong Group. Tourism, retailing and wholesaling are also the pillars of the city's service sector.

More recently, the city has been feeling the effects of the coal downturn, with mining demand collapsing amidst a slowdown in China's economic growth.

== Transportation ==
A new high-speed railway station in Shuangyashan City is the Jiamusi Mudanjiang high-speed railway line, which can reach Harbin, Dalian, Shijiazhuang and other cities. The average time to Harbin is 3 hours and the average time to Jiamusi is 25 minutes. Shuangyashan is at the end of the Harbin to Shuangyashan railway spur link, about 15 hours from Harbin by train and 90 minutes from Jiamusi, the closest prefecture-level city. A freeway connects the town to Jiamusi over a distance of 57 km (35 mi). There is a modern coach service as well which does this trip in approximately 45 minutes. The city is 80 km (50 mi) from Jiamusi Airport, which operates regular flights to Beijing, Dalian, Shanghai, Qingdao, Guangzhou, Sanya and Khabarovsk.

== Sight-seeing ==
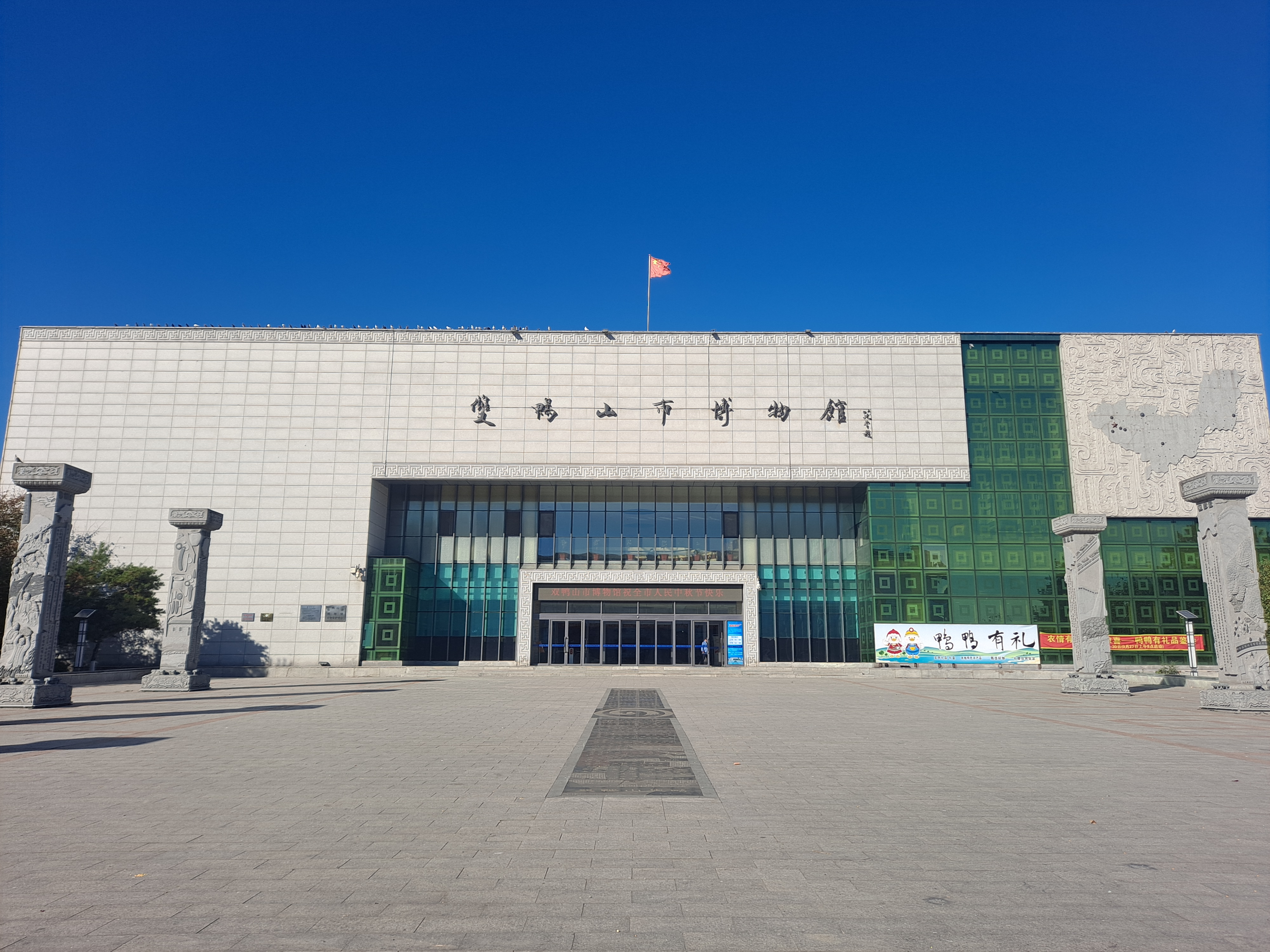
Shuangyashan Museum

Shuangyashan is surrounded by small mountains, and a large park based around one of these mountains forms a major feature of the outdoor life of the town. During the winter, this pine and elm-covered mountain forms an area for recreational activities.
