= Jianshan, Shuangyashan =

Jianshan 尖山区
- District
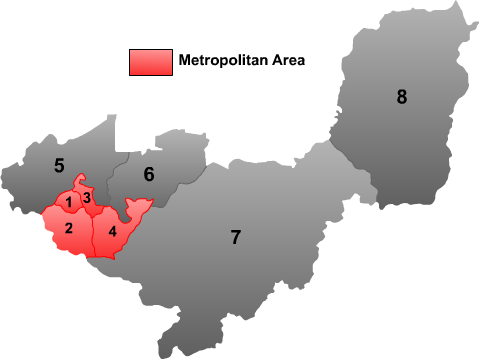
- Location of Jianshan ("1") within Shuangyashan City

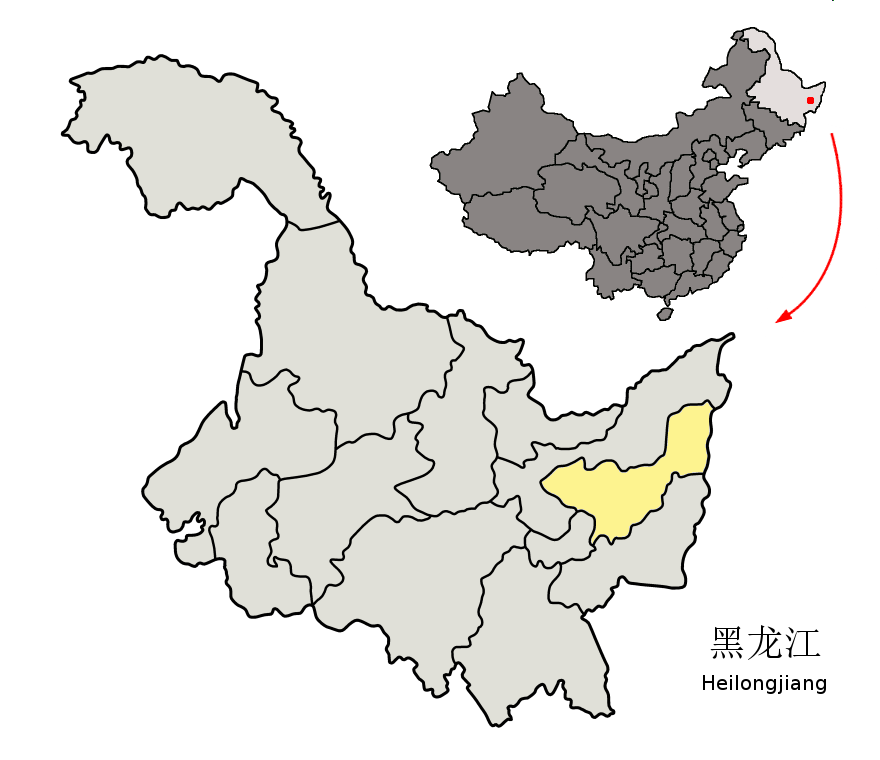
- Location of Shuangyashan City in Heilongjiang
- Coordinates: 46°38′47″N 131°09′31″E
- Country: China
- Province: Heilongjiang
- Prefecture-level city: Shuangyashan
- District seat: Tiexi Subdistrict

Area
  - Total: 118 km^{2} (46 sq mi)

Population (2020 census)
  - Total: 262,359
  - Density: 2,220/km^{2} (5,760/sq mi)
- Time zone: UTC+8 (China Standard)
- Website: www.sysjs.gov.cn

Jianshan District (simplified Chinese: 尖山区; traditional Chinese: 尖山區; pinyin: Jiānshān Qū) is a district and the seat of the city of Shuangyashan, Heilongjiang province, China.

== Administrative divisions ==
Jianshan District is divided into 7 subdistricts and 1 township.

7 subdistricts

- Ermalu (二马路街道), Bamalu (八马路街道), Zhongxinzhan (中心站街道), Fu'an (富安街道), Yaode (窑地街道), Chang'an (长安街道), Tiexi (铁西街道)

1 township

- Anbang (安邦乡)
