= Longtou, Sichuan =

Longtou 龙头镇
- Town
- Location in Sichuan
- Coordinates: 28°24′58″N 104°53′32″E
- Country: People's Republic of China
- Province: Sichuan
- Prefecture-level city: Yibin
- County: Changning
- Village-level divisions: 2 residential communities 14 villages
- Elevation: 306 m (1,004 ft)
- Time zone: UTC+8 (China Standard)

Longtou (simplified Chinese: 龙头; traditional Chinese: 龍頭; pinyin: Lóngtóu; lit. 'dragon head (faucet)') is a town in Changning County, in southeastern Sichuan province, China, located at the edge of the Sichuan Basin. As of 2011, it has two residential communities (社区) and 14 villages under its administration. It is about 19 km (12 mi) south of the county seat, Changning Town (长宁镇), and 44 km (27 mi) southeast of Yibin city proper.

== See also ==
- List of township-level divisions of Sichuan
