= Baoqing County =

Baoqing County 宝清县
- County
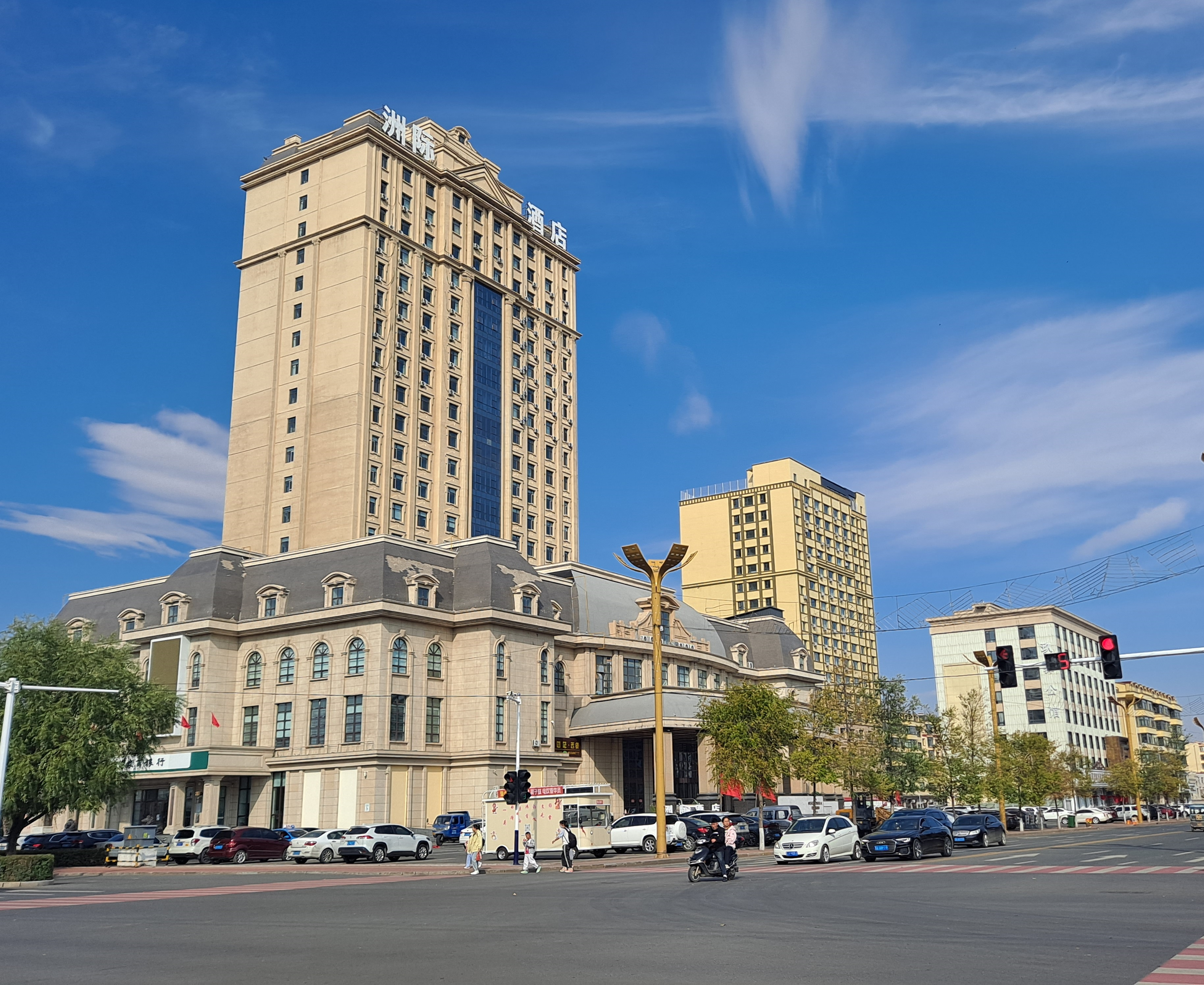
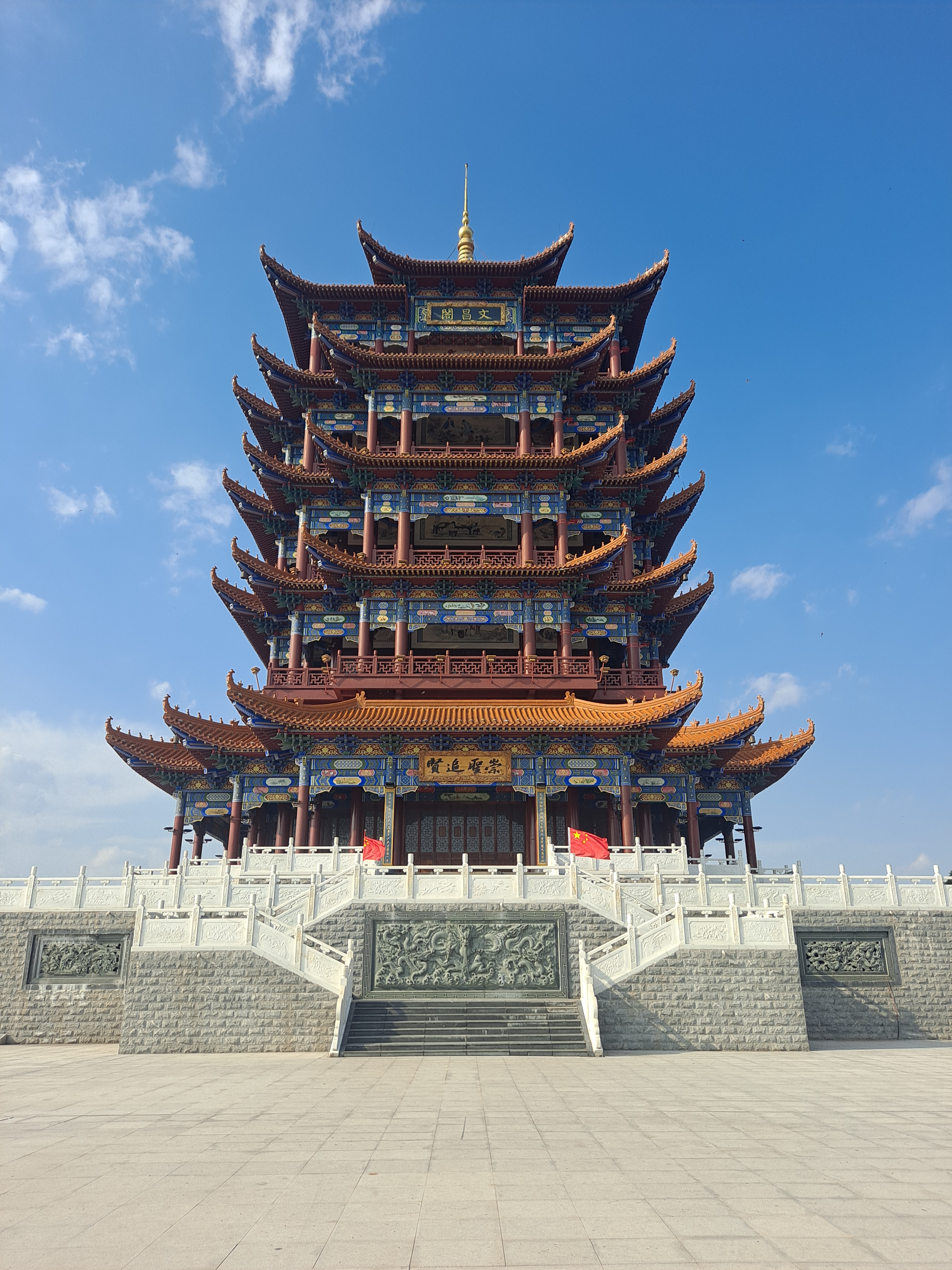
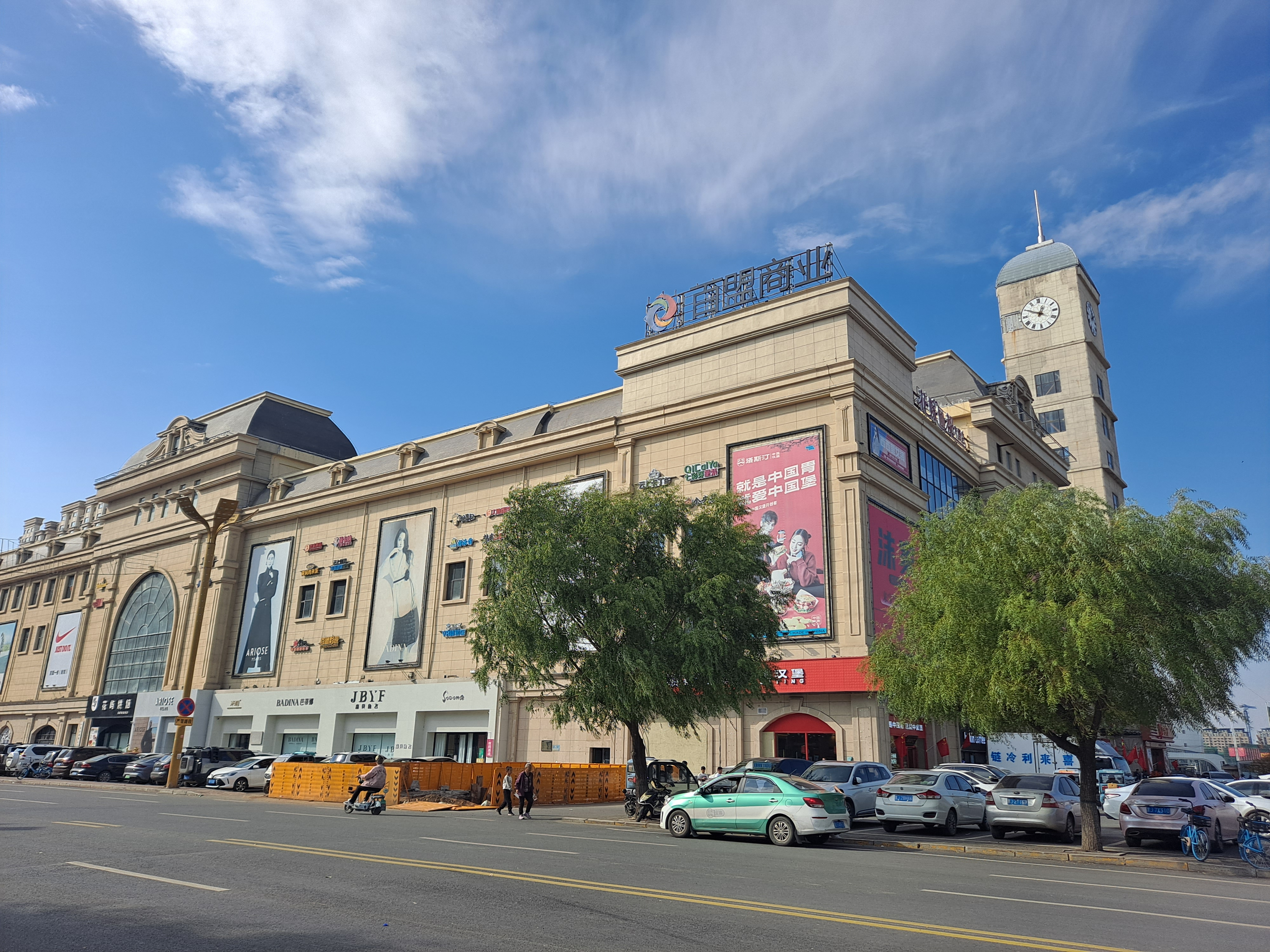
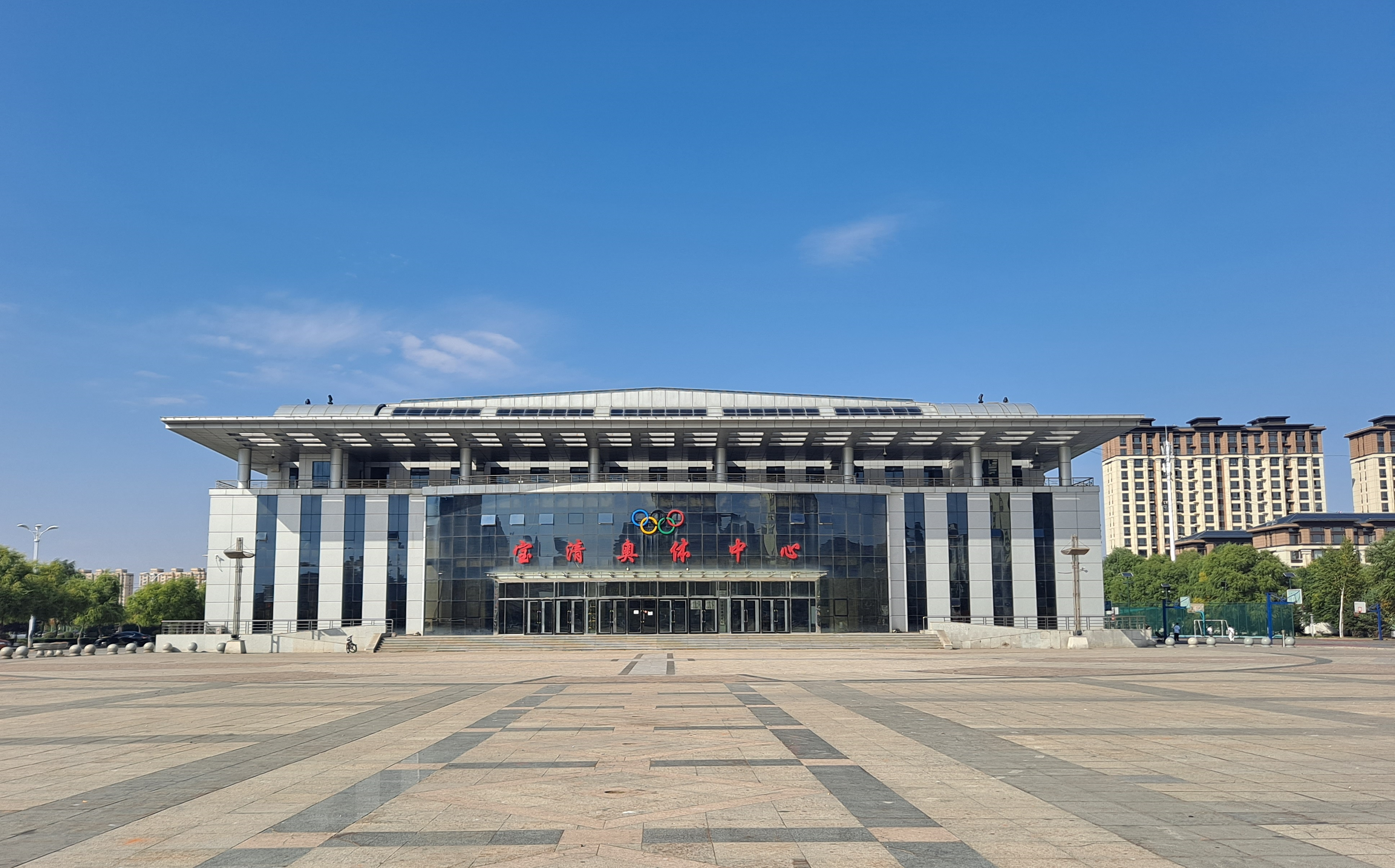
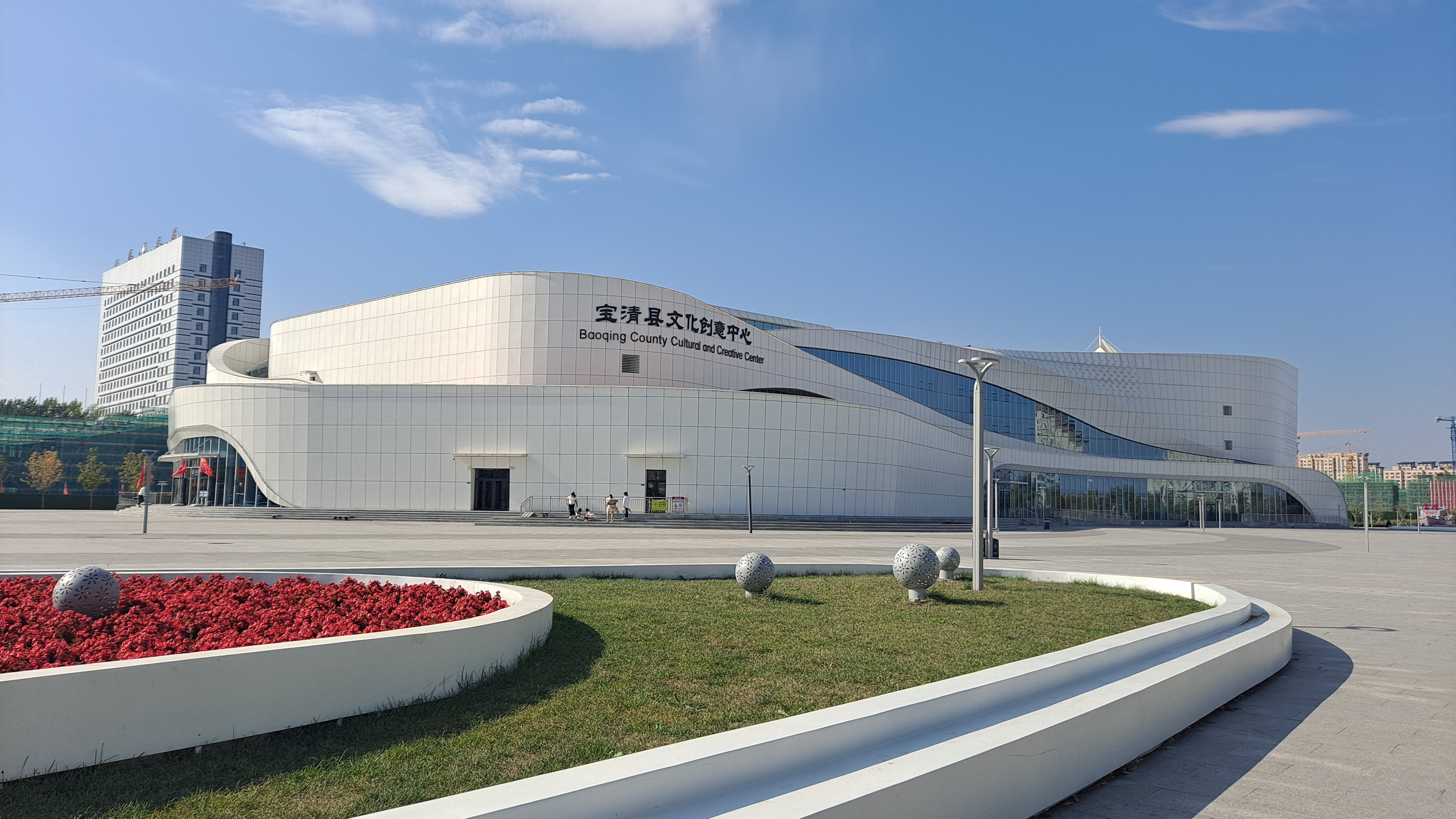
- Baoqing Street View Wenchang Pavilion Baimeng Plaza Olympic Sports Center Cultural and Creative Center

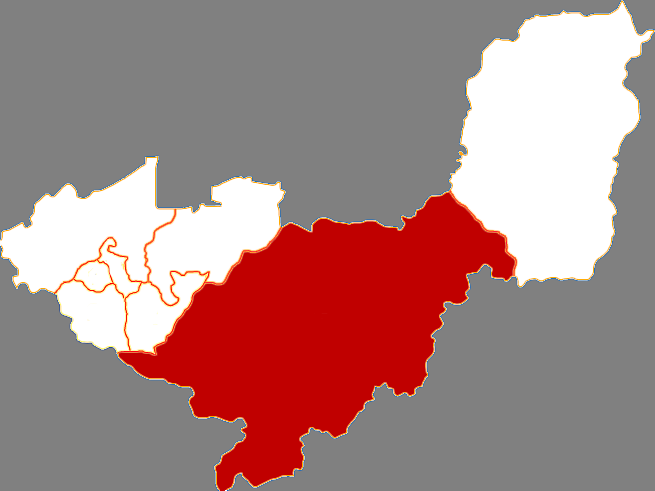

- Location in Heilongjiang
- Coordinates: 46°20′N 132°12′E
- Country: People's Republic of China
- Province: Heilongjiang
- Prefecture-level city: Shuangyashan
- Township-level divisions: 6 towns 4 townships
- County seat: Baoqing Town (宝清镇)

Area
  - Total: 13,443 km^{2} (5,190 sq mi)
- Elevation: 83 m (272 ft)

Population
  - Total: 420,000
  - Density: 31/km^{2} (81/sq mi)
- Time zone: UTC+8 (China Standard)
- Postal code: 155600
- Area code: 0469
- Website: www.hlbaoqing.gov.cn

Baoqing County (simplified Chinese: 宝清县; traditional Chinese: 寶清縣; pinyin: Bǎoqīng Xiàn) is a county of southeastern Heilongjiang province, People's Republic of China. It is under the jurisdiction of the prefecture-level city of Shuangyashan.

== Administrative divisions ==
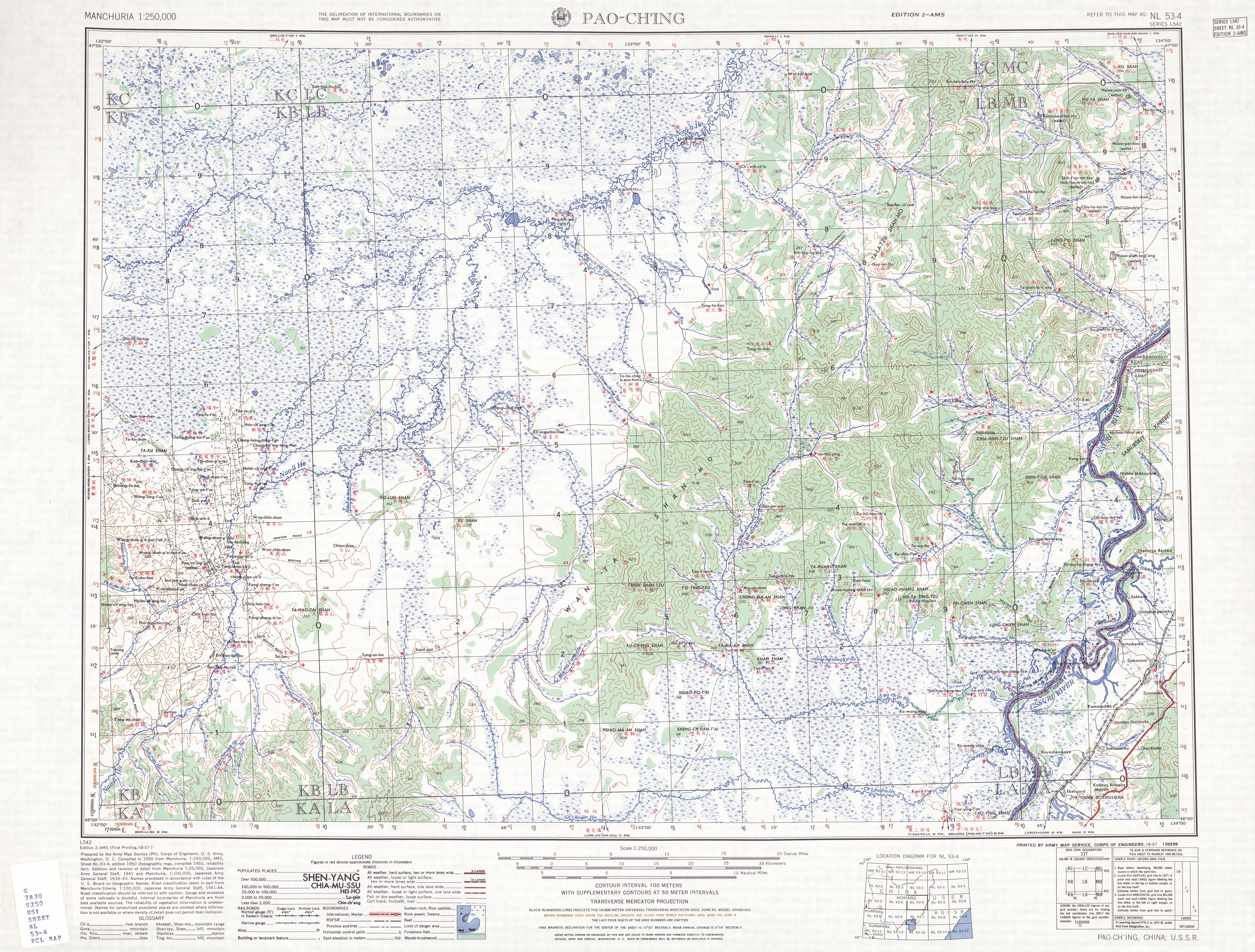
Baoqing (labelled as Pao-ch'ing 寶清) (1955)

There are six towns, and four townships in the county:

=== Towns (镇) ===
- Baoqing Town (宝清镇)
- Qixingpao (七星泡镇)
- Qingyuan (青原镇)
- Longtou (龙头镇)
- Xiaochengzi (小城子镇)
- Jiaxinzi (夹信子镇)

=== Townships (乡) ===
- Zhaoyang Township (朝阳乡)
- Qixinghe Township (七星河乡)
- Wanjinshan Township (万金山乡)
- Jianshanzi Township (尖山子乡)

== Climate ==
Baoqing has a humid continental climate (Köppen Dwa), with long, bitterly cold, but dry winters, and humid, very warm summers. The monthly 24-hour average temperature ranges from −17.5 °C (0.5 °F) in January to 22.3 °C (72.1 °F), while the annual mean is +4.04 °C (39.3 °F), an increase of 0.39 °C (0.70 °F) from 1957 to 1990.

Climate data for Baoqing, elevation 80 m (260 ft), (1991–2020 normals, extremes 1971–2010)
Month	Jan	Feb	Mar	Apr	May	Jun	Jul	Aug	Sep	Oct	Nov	Dec	Year
Record high °C (°F)	4.7 (40.5)	9.3 (48.7)	21.0 (69.8)	31.3 (88.3)	34.2 (93.6)	38.3 (100.9)	37.1 (98.8)	37.2 (99.0)	32.8 (91.0)	27.6 (81.7)	19.7 (67.5)	6.1 (43.0)	38.3 (100.9)
Mean daily maximum °C (°F)	−11.2 (11.8)	−6.5 (20.3)	1.8 (35.2)	12.5 (54.5)	20.3 (68.5)	25.0 (77.0)	27.3 (81.1)	25.9 (78.6)	21.2 (70.2)	12.5 (54.5)	0.0 (32.0)	−9.8 (14.4)	9.9 (49.8)
Daily mean °C (°F)	−16.5 (2.3)	−12.0 (10.4)	−3.3 (26.1)	6.7 (44.1)	14.4 (57.9)	19.7 (67.5)	22.5 (72.5)	21.0 (69.8)	15.3 (59.5)	6.8 (44.2)	−4.7 (23.5)	−14.4 (6.1)	4.6 (40.3)
Mean daily minimum °C (°F)	−21.8 (−7.2)	−17.9 (−0.2)	−8.9 (16.0)	0.8 (33.4)	8.6 (47.5)	14.5 (58.1)	18.0 (64.4)	16.5 (61.7)	9.8 (49.6)	1.3 (34.3)	−9.4 (15.1)	−19.1 (−2.4)	−0.6 (30.9)
Record low °C (°F)	−37.2 (−35.0)	−36.8 (−34.2)	−30.3 (−22.5)	−13.7 (7.3)	−4.3 (24.3)	2.7 (36.9)	9.3 (48.7)	5.5 (41.9)	−5.3 (22.5)	−20.1 (−4.2)	−31.6 (−24.9)	−32.6 (−26.7)	−37.2 (−35.0)
Average precipitation mm (inches)	6.4 (0.25)	3.8 (0.15)	13.9 (0.55)	26.8 (1.06)	58.6 (2.31)	74.4 (2.93)	122.1 (4.81)	107.1 (4.22)	60.2 (2.37)	32.9 (1.30)	14.9 (0.59)	8 (0.3)	529.1 (20.84)
Average precipitation days (≥ 0.1 mm)	5.8	5.1	6.2	8.6	12.0	13.1	13.2	13.1	10.7	8.4	5.8	6.6	108.6
Average snowy days	9.4	7.3	10.1	4.3	0.1	0	0	0	0	2.6	8.1	11.2	53.1
Average relative humidity (%)	65	60	56	54	58	68	77	80	70	59	60	66	64
Mean monthly sunshine hours	166.4	191.1	228.3	218.1	231.3	233.0	230.8	222.6	225.9	200.1	164.2	151.8	2,463.6
Percentage possible sunshine	59	65	62	53	50	50	49	51	61	60	59	57	56
Source 1: China Meteorological Administration
Source 2: Weather China

== Demographics ==
The population of the district was 416,075 in 1999.
