= Changning County, Sichuan =

Changning County 长宁县
- County
- Location of the seat in Sichuan
- Coordinates: 28°35′N 104°55′E
- Country: China
- Province: Sichuan
- Prefecture-level city: Yibin
- County seat: Changning

Area
  - Total: 975 km^{2} (376 sq mi)
- Elevation: 278 m (912 ft)

Population (2020 census)
  - Total: 327,904
  - Density: 336/km^{2} (871/sq mi)
- Time zone: UTC+8 (China Standard)
- Website: www.sccn.gov.cn

Changning County (simplified Chinese: 长宁县; traditional Chinese: 長寧縣; pinyin: Chángníng Xiàn; lit. 'long peace') is a county of Sichuan Province, China. It is under the administration of Yibin City.

== Administrative divisions ==
Changning County administers 13 towns:

- Changning 长宁镇
- Meidong 梅硐镇
- Shuanghe 双河镇
- Dongdi 硐底镇
- Huatan 花滩镇
- Zhuhai 竹海镇
- Laoweng 老翁镇
- Guhe 古河镇
- Longtou 龙头镇
- Tonggu 铜鼓镇
- Jingjiang 井江镇
- Tongluo 铜锣镇
- Meibai 梅白镇

== Climate ==
Climate data for Changning, elevation 279 m (915 ft), (1991–2020 normals, extremes 1981–present)
Month	Jan	Feb	Mar	Apr	May	Jun	Jul	Aug	Sep	Oct	Nov	Dec	Year
Record high °C (°F)	20.8 (69.4)	25.0 (77.0)	33.3 (91.9)	35.6 (96.1)	38.7 (101.7)	38.0 (100.4)	38.9 (102.0)	41.3 (106.3)	40.9 (105.6)	33.1 (91.6)	26.4 (79.5)	20.0 (68.0)	41.3 (106.3)
Mean daily maximum °C (°F)	10.9 (51.6)	14.1 (57.4)	19.1 (66.4)	25.0 (77.0)	28.0 (82.4)	29.9 (85.8)	33.0 (91.4)	33.0 (91.4)	28.0 (82.4)	22.3 (72.1)	17.8 (64.0)	12.2 (54.0)	22.8 (73.0)
Daily mean °C (°F)	8.1 (46.6)	10.6 (51.1)	14.7 (58.5)	19.8 (67.6)	22.9 (73.2)	25.1 (77.2)	27.8 (82.0)	27.6 (81.7)	23.7 (74.7)	18.9 (66.0)	14.5 (58.1)	9.5 (49.1)	18.6 (65.5)
Mean daily minimum °C (°F)	6.3 (43.3)	8.3 (46.9)	11.8 (53.2)	16.3 (61.3)	19.4 (66.9)	22.0 (71.6)	24.2 (75.6)	24.0 (75.2)	21.0 (69.8)	16.8 (62.2)	12.5 (54.5)	7.9 (46.2)	15.9 (60.6)
Record low °C (°F)	−1.0 (30.2)	−0.9 (30.4)	1.5 (34.7)	7.0 (44.6)	10.9 (51.6)	14.8 (58.6)	17.5 (63.5)	18.4 (65.1)	14.5 (58.1)	7.0 (44.6)	2.2 (36.0)	−2.0 (28.4)	−2.0 (28.4)
Average precipitation mm (inches)	25.6 (1.01)	24.5 (0.96)	42.1 (1.66)	69.9 (2.75)	109.5 (4.31)	156.1 (6.15)	176.9 (6.96)	162.5 (6.40)	119.2 (4.69)	78.6 (3.09)	32.8 (1.29)	24.8 (0.98)	1,022.5 (40.25)
Average precipitation days (≥ 0.1 mm)	13.3	10.9	13.6	13.8	15.3	17.3	13.8	12.9	15.2	17.8	12.9	13.2	170
Average snowy days	0.2	0.1	0	0	0	0	0	0	0	0	0	0.1	0.4
Average relative humidity (%)	86	83	79	76	77	82	80	79	84	87	86	87	82
Mean monthly sunshine hours	29.1	44.4	82.1	116.4	117.4	102.4	161.6	165.6	88.4	48.7	44.8	26.5	1,027.4
Percentage possible sunshine	9	14	22	30	28	25	38	41	24	14	14	8	22
Source: China Meteorological AdministrationAll-time Jun Record low
