= List of coal mining accidents in China =

This is a list of coal mining accidents in China.

== 1940s ==
=== 1942 ===
- On April 26, 1942, a gas and coal-dust explosion in Benxihu Colliery killed 1,549 miners, making it the worst disaster in the history of coal mining.

== 1950s ==
=== 1950 ===
- On February 27, 1950, 174 miners died in Yilou Mine accident in Henan Province.

== 1960s ==
1960

- On May 9, 1960, in Laobaidong Colliery Disaster 684 died after methane explosion.

== 1990s ==
=== 1991 ===
- On April 21, 1991, in Sanjiaohe mine blast 148 died after gas explosion.

== 2000s ==
=== 2000 ===
- On September 27, 2000, in Muchonggou mine blast 159 died after gas explosion.

5,798 workers were killed in 2,863 Chinese coal mine accidents during 2000.

=== 2001 ===
5,670 workers were killed in 3,082 Chinese coal mine accidents during 2001.

=== 2002 ===
- On June 20, 2002, in Chengzihe mine blast 124 died after gas explosion.

6,995 workers were killed in 4,344 Chinese coal mine accidents during 2002.

=== 2003 ===
6,434 workers were killed in 4,143 Chinese coal mine accidents during 2003.

=== 2004 ===
- On October 20, 2004, in Daping mine blast 148 died after gas explosion.
- On November 28, 2004, in Chenjiashan mine blast 166 died after gas explosion.

6,027 workers were killed in 3,639 Chinese coal mine accidents during 2004.

=== 2005 ===
- On February 14, 2005, Over 214 miners were killed in the 2005 Sunjiawan mine disaster
- On March 19, 2005, an explosion at the Xishui Colliery and neighboring Kangjiayao coal mines killed 72.
- On July 11, 2005, an explosion at the Shenlong mine killed 83.
- On August 7, 2005, in Daxing mine flood 123 died.
- On November 27, 2005, 171 miners were killed by a blast in the Dongfeng Coal mine in Qitaihe city, Heilongjiang province. The mine owner (plus 5 others) was later tried in court for negligence and sentenced to 6 years in prison.
- On December 8, 2005, a gas explosion kills 54 miners and traps 22 in the Liuguantun Mine, Tangshan Kaiping district.

5,986 workers were killed in 3,341 Chinese coal mine accidents during 2005.

=== 2006 ===
- On February 1, 2006, the Sihe coal mine in Shanxi killed 23 miners.
- On May 18, 2006, an Induation disaster at the Xinjing coal mine in the Shanxi province killed 56 miners.
- On April 29, 2006, 27 miners were killed in an explosion in the privately owned mine in Wayaobu, Shaanxi.
- On July 15, 2006, at the Linjiazhuang coal mine in Shanxi an explosion killed 50 people with seven more missing.
- On November 5, 2006, at the Jiaojiazhai coal mine in Shanxi an explosion killed 40 with seven more missing.
- On November 13, 2006 Nanshan Colliery disaster, a fatal gas explosion, killed 24 people.

=== 2007 ===
- In March 2007, over 100 were killed in 8 tragedies.
- In August 2007, 181 miners died when heavy rains flooded two mines in eastern Shandong province.
- A coal mine gas leak on November 11, 2007, had at least 35 confirmed deaths.
- On December 6, 2007, 105 workers died in a mine blast in Shanxi province's Hongtong county.

=== 2008 ===
- On April 11, 2008, a gas explosion resulted in 14 miners dead and two reported missing in the No. 3 Coal Mine in Huludao's Shaguotan village.
- On September 4, 2008, twenty-four miners were killed and six injured in Fuxin, Liaoning province.
- On September 28, 2008, 31 miners were killed and nine were missing in Dengfeng city, Henan province.
- On November 10, 2008, four were killed and thirteen injured Wannian Coal Mine of Jizhong Energy Group Co., Ltd. in Handan City, Hebei Province.

3,000 workers were killed in Chinese coal mines during 2008.

=== 2009 ===
- On February 22, 77 miners died and over 100 were injured in an explosion at the Tunlan coal mine in Shanxi. The blast was China's worst industrial accident in a year, until the November, 2009, Heilongjiang mine explosion.
- On March 20, six miners were killed and four were missing at the Lianfa Coal Mine in Qinglong County, Qianxinan Buyei and Miao Autonomous Prefecture, Guizhou province
- On April 4, 12 miners died in the Jinli Coal Mine in Xingnong Township, Jidong County, Jixi City after water flowed in from an abandoned coal mine.
- On April 17, 18 miners die in a dynamite explosion in a dynamite warehouse of a coal mine in Chenzhou city, Yongxing.
- On May 2, 7 people died of gas poisoning at the Xinfeng Coal Mine, Dengfeng city
- On May 15, 10 miners die in a mine blast in a licensed private Chashan Coal Mine in Zhaotong city, in Zhenxiong county, Yunnan province.
- On May 16, 11 miners die of asphyxiation in Shuozhou, Shaanxi province.
- On May 29, a gas explosion at the Tonghua coal mine associated with the Songzao Mining Bureau of Chongqing in Chongqing kills 30 and injures 59.
- On September 8, a gas explosion at a Henan mine left 67 confirmed dead with 9 still missing.
- On November 21, 108 people died at the Xinxing mine in Heilongjiang province, following a gas explosion caused by trapped, pressurized gases underground.

== 2010s ==
=== 2010 ===
- In January, at least 25 people are killed and at least three others are trapped in a mine fire in Xiangtan County in Hunan.
- On March 1 The Luotuoshan coal mine flood trapped 77 workers, of which 45 were rescued, 1 was confirmed dead, and 31 were left for dead.
- On March 15, the Dongxing Coal Mining Co fire began, leaving 25 miners dead. The mine had been in renovations to increase output.
- On March 28, 153 people were trapped in a coal mine by a flood that occurred by breaking into a water-filled shaft in the Wangjialing coal mine in Shanxi.
- On May 13, at least 21 people were killed and at least five were wounded when an explosion occurred at the privately run Yuanyang colliery in Puding County, Anshun, Guizhou.

=== 2012 ===
- On August 29, 45 miners were killed in the Xiaojiawan coal mine explosion.
- On the September 3, 14 miners were killed at Gaokeng Coal Mine in Jiangxi province.

=== 2013 ===
- On March 12, an outburst in Machang Coal Mine caused 25 people dead.
- On March 29, a landslide in Gyama Mine, Tibet caused 66 people dead and 17 missing.
- On March 29, an explosion in Babao Coal Mine caused 36 people dead. A second explosion in Babao Coal Mine on April 1 caused 17 people dead.
- On May 11, an explosion in Taozigou Coal Mine caused 28 people dead.

1049 workers were killed in Chinese coal mines during 2013.

=== 2014 ===
- In June 2014, 7 were dead in a coal mine in Hebei province

=== 2018 ===
- On October 20, 18 people were trapped and 11 people were killed due to a rock burst in a Shandong mine.
- On December 7, a partial ceiling collapse at a coal mine in Wenshang County, Jining, Shandong killed 3 people and injured 3 more.

== 2020s ==
=== 2020 ===
- On February 23, a ceiling collapse at a coal mine in Yuci District, Jinzhong, Shanxi killed 3 people.
- On February 29, a ceiling collapse at a coal mine in Luoping County, Qujing, Yunnan killed 5 people.
- On March 7, an explosion at a coal mine in Yanjin County, Zhaotong, Yunnan killed 4 people and injured 5 more.
- On June 10, a gas leak at a coal mine in the town of Longmen, Hancheng, Weinan, Shaanxi killed 7 people.
- On August 5, a ceiling collapse at a coal mine in Jinzhong, Shanxi killed 3 people.
- On September 27, a fire at a coal mine in Chongqing operated by Chongqing Energy Investment Group killed 16 people and injured 38 more.
- On October 20, a gas explosion at a coal mine in Shanxi operated by Shanxi Lu'an Environmental Energy killed 4 people and injured 1 more.
- On November 4, an accident at a coal mine in Tongchuan, Shaanxi killed 8 people.
- On December 4, a carbon monoxide leak at a coal mine in Yongchuan District, Chongqing killed 23 people.
