= Lingbei =

Lingbei may refer to the following locations in China:

- Lingbei, Suixi (岭北镇), in Suixi County, Guangdong
- Lingbei, Xiangyin (岭北镇), in Xiangyin County, Hunan
- Lingbei, Hegang (岭北街道), in Xingshan District, Hegang, Heilongjiang
- Lingbei, Yangshan (岭背镇), in Yangshan County, Guangdong
- Lingbei, Lingyuan (凌北街道), in Lingyuan, Liaoning
- Lingbei province (岭北行省) during the Yuan dynasty
