= Babao =

Babao may refer to

- Babao seal paste, a traditional Chinese handicraft
- 2013 Babao Coal Mine explosions in China
- Caridad Sanchez-Babao (born 1933), Filipino actress
- Christine Bersola-Babao (born 1970), Filipino journalist, wife of Julius
- Julius Babao (born 1968), Filipino journalist
