= Eight Treasures =

Eight precious treasures in China

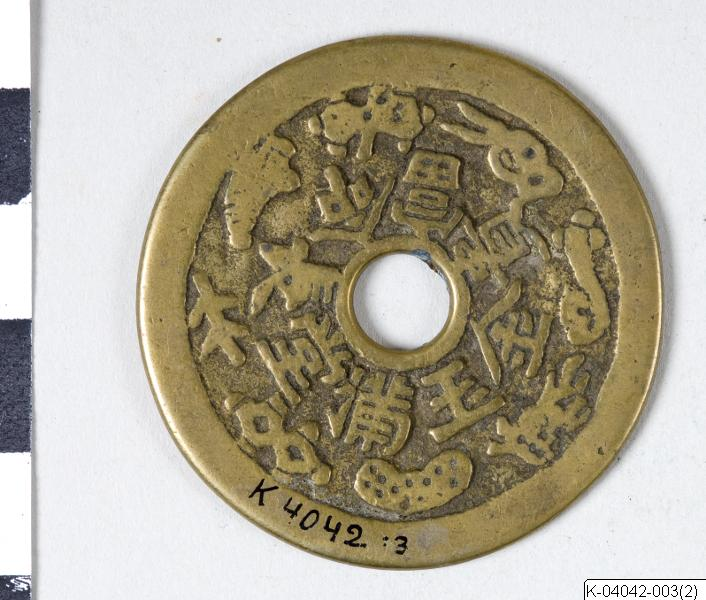
The eight treasures on a Chinese amulet.

The Eight Treasures (simplified Chinese: 八宝; traditional Chinese: 八寶; pinyin: Bābǎo), also known as the Eight Precious Things, are popular symbols often depicted in Chinese art and on Chinese numismatic charms.

While technically they may be any subset of the much longer list of the Hundred Treasures, there is a combination that is most popular.

1. The Wish-granting Pearl (寳珠/宝珠, Bǎozhū) or flaming pearl symbolises the granting of wishes.
2. The Double Lozenges (方勝/方胜, Fāngshèng) symbolises happiness in marriage and counteracts maleficent influences.
3. The Stone Chime (磬, Qìng) symbolises a just and upright life.
4. The pair of Rhinoceros Horns (犀角, Xījiǎo) symbolises happiness.
5. The Double Coins (雙錢/双钱, Shuāngqián) symbolises wealth.
6. The gold or silver Ingot (錠/锭, Dìng)
7. The Coral (珊瑚, Shānhú)
8. The Wish-granting Scepter (如意, Rúyì)

== Eight Treasures in art ==
=== Eight Treasures charms ===
Chinese Eight Treasures charms (Traditional Chinese: 八寶錢; Simplified Chinese: 八宝钱; Pinyin: bā bǎo qián), also known as the "Eight Precious Things charms" and the "Eight Auspicious Treasures charms", are coin amulets that depict the Eight Treasures. Those most commonly depicted on older charms are the ceremonial ruyi (sceptre), coral, lozenge, rhinoceros horns, sycees, stone chimes, and flaming pearl. Eight Treasures charms can alternatively display the eight precious organs of the Buddha's body, the eight auspicious signs, various emblems of the eight Immortals from Taoism, or eight normal Chinese character.

They often have thematic inscriptions. For example a Chinese eight treasures charm on display at the Museum of Ethnography, Sweden has the inscription Chángmìng fùguì jīnyù mǎntáng (長命富貴金玉滿堂) which could be translated as "longevity, wealth and honour - may gold and jade fill your house (halls)".

=== Seal paste ===
In Zhangzhou, Fujian, China there is a company named Babao seal paste which is named after the Eight Treasures. Babao seal paste was added to the National Intangible Cultural Heritage List in 2008. and the China Time-honored Brand list by the Chinese Ministry of Commerce in 2011.

== See also ==
- Ashtamangala, eight sacred treasures and symbols in Buddhism, Hinduism, and Jainism.
- Cintamani, a wish-fulfilling jewel in Buddhism.
