= Qixia gold mine accident =

2021 accident at a gold mine in China after an explosion

Coordinates: 37.33466°N 120.73158°E

- Date: 10 January 2021
- Location: Qixia, Shandong, China
- Type: mining accident
- Deaths: 10
- Injuries: unknown
- Missing: 1

The Qixia gold mine accident was a mining accident that occurred on 10 January 2021 in Qixia, Shandong, China. An access tunnel collapsed due to an explosion at the Hushan (笏山) gold mine, trapping twenty-two miners underground. As of 10 February 2021, eleven miners had been rescued, ten were found dead, and one remains missing.

== Accident ==
At 2 pm on 10 January, an explosion occurred 240 meters underground in the Yantai Qixia gold mine in the Shandong Province (China). The twenty-two miners working at 648 meters and lower became trapped underground. The explosion severely damaged cages, ladders, and communication systems within the shafts. Because of an inadequate initial assessment of rescue difficulty, the gold mine company did not report the situation to the Qixia Municipal Emergency Management Bureau until 8:05 pm on 11 January. Qixia municipal committee of the Chinese Communist Party (CCP) then reported the situation to the Yantai municipal committee of the CCP less than an hour later.

After receiving the report that evening, the Shandong Provincial Committee of the CCP initiated the Integrated Emergency Rescue Command for provinces, cities and counties. Seven rescue groups were dispatched along with technical experts, logistics support, and media liaison. Investigation into the accident, and communication with the miners' families were being organized, along with medical treatment for victims, and on-site COVID-19 protocol. Song Yuanming (宋元明) and Li Wanjiang (李万疆), deputy director of the State Mine Safety Supervision Bureau, were connected by video conference that night to guide the rescue effort.

In the morning of 12 January, Liu Jiayi (刘家义), secretary of the CCP of Shandong Province, who was attending a seminar for leading cadres at the provincial and ministerial levels in Beijing, and Li Ganjie (李干杰), deputy secretary of the CCP provincial committee and governor of Shandong Province, asked CCP General Secretary Xi Jinping to rush to the scene of the Hushan gold mine accident in Shandong Province. Meanwhile, Huang Yuzhi (黄玉治), Vice Minister of Emergency Management in the People's Republic of China and Head of the State Administration of Mine Safety and Supervision, arrived at the scene at noon on 12 January to guide the rescue. Wang Shujian (王书坚), executive vice-governor of the Shandong provincial government, arrived at the scene in the morning of 12 January.

== Rescue ==
On 12 January, at 7 pm, the on-site rescue command held a second press conference. Yantai City Emergency Management Bureau Director Sun Shufu (孙树福) gave updates on the rescue. Progress was made in accelerating the removal of obstructive debris in the ventilation shaft, borehole drilling operations, and opening a communication and life-supply channel with possible survivors. At 12 pm on the 14th, 43 rescue workers were added to the site. The emergency rescue command team mobilized a total of 11 rescue teams, 393 rescue workers, 70 machinery and mining equipment to aid in the rescue.

In the afternoon of 17 January, a third hole was drilled for rescue efforts. At about 10 pm, the hole was set up for delivery of vital supplies. By means of a weighted rope, workers slowly lowered flashlights, beverages, medicines, pens and papers into the narrow borehole. The supplies reached the end of the rope within an hour, and by midnight, the rope was pulled back with supplies removed and a note returned.

At noon on 19 January, the Health Emergency Office of the National Health and Health Commission led five national experts to the area to strengthen the rescue force. The national expert group consists of Beijing Xiehe Hospital, Beijing Tiantan Hospital, Beijing Chaoyang Hospital and Beijing Anding Hospital.

On 22 January, progress was steady on maintaining channels for monitoring, detection, and drainage support. A search was conducted in the first borehole, with no signs of victims. The depth of the mine, solid rock and utility lines served as obstacles in reaching miners still trapped underground.

=== Rescue of miners ===
By 24 January, eleven miners had been rescued after being brought out one at a time in a cuffa (big metallic bucket used in mine shafts to transport personnel and equipment).

On 25 January at 5 pm, nine miners were found dead due to the blast from the second explosion, with an additional body discovered later.

== Investigation of responsibility ==
On 13 January, the third press conference was held at the scene of the accident at Qixia Lushan gold mine, and Li Bo (李波), deputy mayor of Yantai City, said at the press conference that the person responsible for the accident had been brought under control. On 13 January, Shandong Provincial Emergency Management Department issued a notice to quickly carry out a centralized law enforcement inspection in the province.

Secretary Yao Xiuxia (姚秀霞) and Deputy Secretary and Mayor Zhu Tao (朱涛), both members of the CCP Qixia City Committee, were removed from their posts by the provincial CCP committee due to neglect of responsibility in reporting the accident 30 hours late.

== See also ==
- 2010 Copiapó mining accident – Cave-in and miner rescue in Atacama Region, Chile
- 2018 Shandong mine collapse – Collapse of a mining tunnel in the Shandong province in China
- Gold mining – Process of extracting gold from the ground
- Gold mining in China – Overview of gold mining in the People's Republic of China
- Mine rescue – Rescue of persons trapped after mining accidents
- Mining accident – Accident occurring during the process of mining minerals
- Qixia, Shandong – County-level city in Shandong, People's Republic of China
- Rescue – Operations for life saving, removal from danger and liberation from restraint
