= Hegang No.1 High School =

Coordinates: 47°19′9″N 130°16′12″E

- 鹤岗市第一中学
- Hegang; China

Information
- Type: Public
- Motto: 诚信、严谨、务实、创新
- Established: 1950
- School district: Gongnong District
- Principal: Song Shichen（宋士臣）
- Faculty: 436
- Grades: senior high school
- Enrollment: c. 5500
- Building Area: c. 85000m^{2}
- Campus Area: c. 140000m^{2}
- Website: www.hgyz.net

Hegang No. 1 High School (Chinese: 鶴崗市第一中學, pinyin: Hègǎng shì dìyī zhōngxué) is a public high school in Hegang, China. It was established in March 1950.

The province of Heilongjiang awarded the school the label of key high school in 1963. The school was awarded the label of exemplar senior high school in 2000. In the 2014 book History of Hegan, Yupu Zhang wrote that Hegan No. 1 High School was "identified as one of the top 100 middle schools in the country and one of the 'first batch of diversified and characteristic provincial pilot schools for general high schools' in the province".

The school began offering kabaddi classes in 2018.
