= Xingshan =

Xingshan may refer to the following locations in China:

- Xingshan County (兴山县), of Yichang, Hubei
- Xingshan District (兴山区), Hegang, Heilongjiang
