= Xiaojiawan coal mine disaster =

2012 gas explosion in Panzhihua, Sichuan Province, China

Coordinates: 26°34′39″N 101°42′7″E

- Date: August 29, 2012
- Time: 18:00 CST
- Location: Panzhihua, Sichuan, China
- Deaths: 46 dead

The Xiaojiawan coal mine disaster was a mining accident which happened on 29 August 2012 at the Xiaojiawan coal mine (Chinese: 肖家湾煤矿), located in Panzhihua in Sichuan Province, China. It was the deadliest mine accident since the 2009 Heilongjiang mine explosion. As a result of a gas explosion in the Xiaojiawan coal mine, at least 46 miners were killed. 51 were sent to hospital with seven in critical condition. It was reported that 16 miners died from carbon monoxide poisoning, while three others died in hospital.

At the moment of explosion there were 154 miners working at the mine. The shaft of the mine was severely destroyed. As of 30 August 2012, more than 300 rescuers have taken part in the rescue operation. Rescue operations are complicated due to high temperatures reaching 90 °C (194 °F).

The Xiaojiawan coal mine is an integrated coal mine with an annual output of 90,000 metric tons (89,000 long tons; 99,000 short tons) of coal. Its trial run started in March 2011. In December 2011, it gained a safety license. The mine is owned by Zhengjin Industry and Trade Co. Ltd. Three owners of the mine were detained for investigation.

== See also ==
- List of coal mining accidents in China
