= 2009 Heilongjiang mine explosion =

Coal mine explosion in China

- Heilongjiang
- Date: November 21, 2009
- Time: 02:30 CST
- Location: Hegang, Heilongjiang, China; 47°18′13″N 130°16′58″E
- Casualties: 108 dead and 29 injured

A mining accident occurred on November 21, 2009, near Hegang in the Heilongjiang, northeastern China, which killed 108 people. A further 29 people were hospitalised. The explosion occurred in the Xinxing coal mine shortly before dawn, at 02:30 CST, when 528 people were believed to be in the pit. Of these, 420 are believed to have been rescued.

== Location and explosion ==
The mine, located close to the China–Russia border, is owned by the state-run Heilongjiang Longmay Mining Holding Group Co., Ltd., which has been open since 1917, and produces 12 million tons of coal per year, making it one of the largest and oldest coal mines in the country. A preliminary investigation concluded that the explosion was caused by trapped, pressurised gases underground and poor ventilation in the mine shaft. The blast was powerful enough that it was felt 10 kilometres (6 mi) away. Many nearby buildings were damaged, including one next to the mine whose roof was blown off. The director of Hegang General Hospital, where the injured were being treated, told the Xinhua News Agency that "most of the injured are suffering from compound injuries, such as respiratory injuries, broken bones and gas poisoning".

== Response ==
A Chinese official said rescue efforts were being impeded by gas and debris from collapsed tunnels. The death toll made it the worst accident of its type within the past two years. While hope for those trapped was fading, a Chinese official stated that the effort was still a rescue operation. San Jingguang, a mining company spokesman stated that "if we haven't found them, to us that means they are still alive."

Chinese Vice-Premier Zhang Dejiang visited the site to inspect rescue efforts on the afternoon of November 21, while General Secretary of the Chinese Communist Party Hu Jintao and Premier of the State Council Wen Jiabao are both said to have "made instructions on the rescue work". Both have also expressed condolences for those killed. Meanwhile, Li Zhanshu, the governor of Heilongjiang called for increased safety standards in Chinese mines, and the provincial work safety bureau vowed to step up its mining reform programme.

Chinese television initially reported that the death toll was 31. It later reported the number of dead had more than doubled over the extremely cold night.

As a result of the explosion, the director, vice director and chief engineer of the mining company are reported to have been removed from their individual posts. The Chinese state prosecutor is investigating the possibility that criminal negligence was responsible for the disaster. Chinese media reported on November 23, 2009, that an investigation had concluded poor management was to blame for the incident. Relatives of the deceased also claimed on November 23 that officials did not notify them of the accident.

== See also ==
- List of coal mining accidents in China
- Xiaojiawan coal mine disaster
