= Xintai =

Xintai city 新泰市
- County-level city
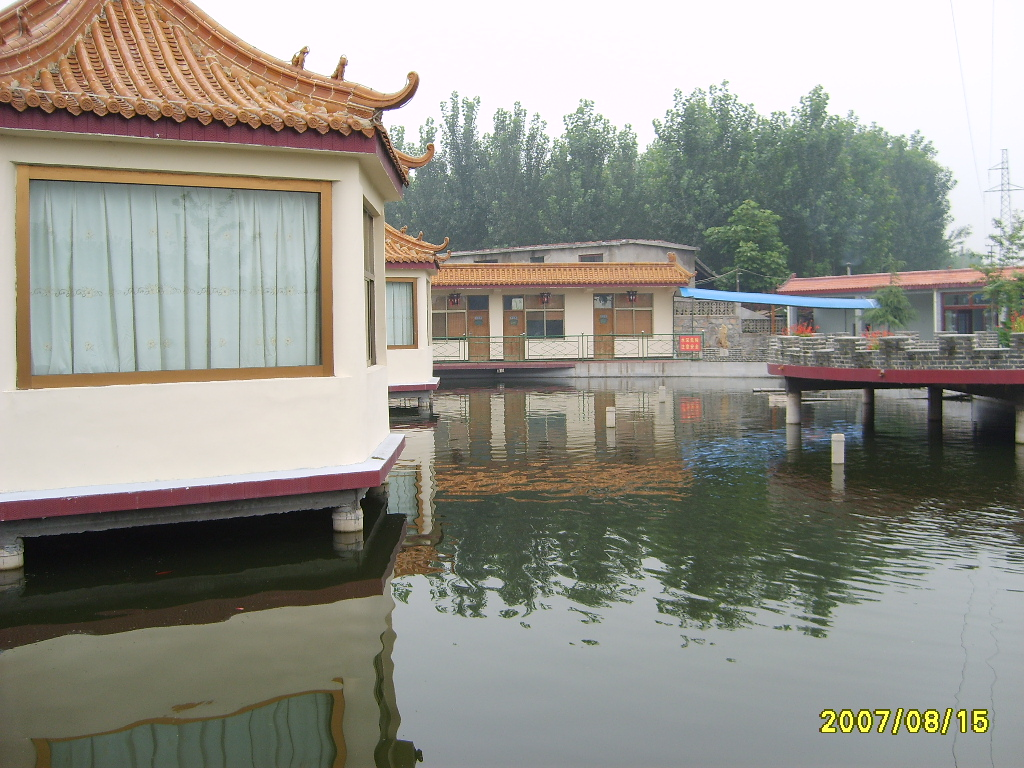

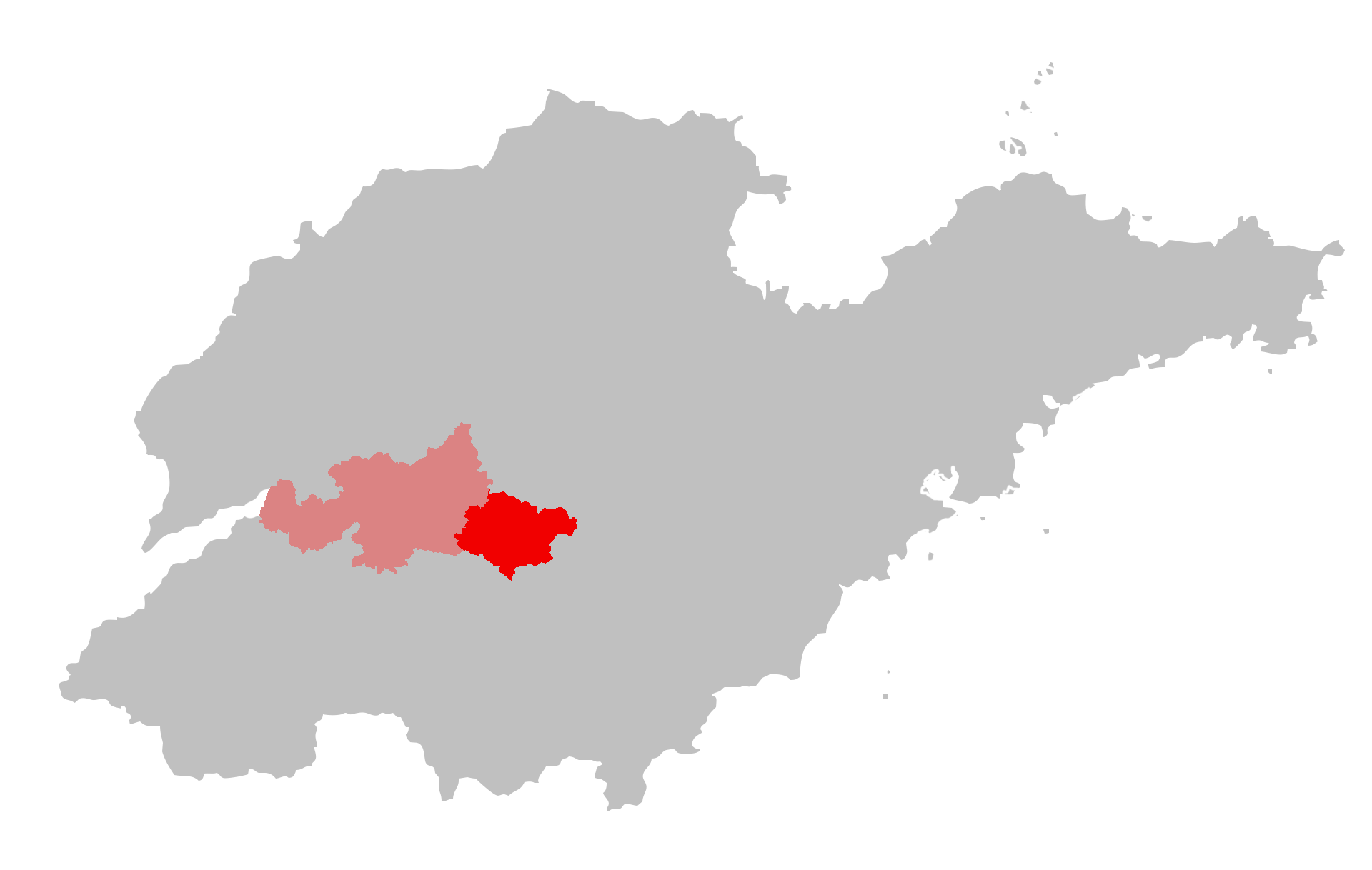
- Xintai in Shandong

- Location of the city center in Shandong
- Coordinates: 35°54′32″N 117°46′05″E
- Country: People's Republic of China
- Province: Shandong
- Prefecture-level city: Tai'an

Area
  - Total: 1,946 km^{2} (751 sq mi)

Population (2017)
  - Total: 1,274,200
  - Density: 654.8/km^{2} (1,696/sq mi)
- Time zone: UTC+8 (China Standard)
- Postal code: 271200
- Website: www.xintai.gov.cn

Xintai (Chinese: 新泰; pinyin: Xīntài) is a county-level city in the central part of Shandong province, People's Republic of China. It is the easternmost county-level division of the prefecture-level city of Tai'an and is located about 50 kilometres (31 mi) to the southeast of downtown Tai'an.

== History ==
Xintai has a long history dating back to the origins of the Chinese civilisation. In 1966, scientists concluded that a homo teeth fossil found in Xintai's Wuzhutai village belonged to a female teenager and that homo erectus were already living in the area five million years ago. Moreover, many primitive social sites belonging to ancient cultures were found on both sides of the Chaiwen River after archaeological excavations, such as the Dawenkou, Longshan and Yueshi cultures. This proves that the ancient Chinese had already created a prelude to the Oriental human civilisation in Xintai some four or five thousand years ago. In the Shang and Zhou dynasties, Xintai served as the capital of the Qi (杞) state. In 219 BC, Qin Shi Huang held a ceremony at Mount Liangfu. Emperor Wu and Emperor Guangwu of the Han dynasty also held similar ceremonies in Xintai. Besides, there were numerous famous Chinese people from Xintai, such as peace activist Liu Xiahui and musician Shi Kuang.

In the early Qing dynasty, in order to improve transport between north and south China, the Yongzheng Emperor ordered the construction of a new connecting road. After Yangliu station was set up, Xintai became an important centre of transport between the north and south.

In August 2007, the Shandong coal mine flood killed 181 miners.

== Climate ==
Xintai lies in the north temperate zone with a monsoon climate. The average annual temperatures is 13.2°C.

Climate data for Xintai, elevation 206 m (676 ft), (1991–2020 normals, extremes 1981–present)
Month	Jan	Feb	Mar	Apr	May	Jun	Jul	Aug	Sep	Oct	Nov	Dec	Year
Record high °C (°F)	17.6 (63.7)	22.3 (72.1)	30.3 (86.5)	34.1 (93.4)	36.5 (97.7)	37.7 (99.9)	42.0 (107.6)	36.8 (98.2)	38.4 (101.1)	34.1 (93.4)	25.2 (77.4)	19.5 (67.1)	42.0 (107.6)
Mean daily maximum °C (°F)	4.3 (39.7)	7.8 (46.0)	14.2 (57.6)	21.3 (70.3)	26.8 (80.2)	30.4 (86.7)	31.2 (88.2)	30.2 (86.4)	26.7 (80.1)	21.0 (69.8)	13.0 (55.4)	6.1 (43.0)	19.4 (67.0)
Daily mean °C (°F)	−0.9 (30.4)	2.2 (36.0)	8.1 (46.6)	15.1 (59.2)	20.9 (69.6)	24.8 (76.6)	26.6 (79.9)	25.7 (78.3)	21.4 (70.5)	15.2 (59.4)	7.6 (45.7)	1.0 (33.8)	14.0 (57.2)
Mean daily minimum °C (°F)	−5.0 (23.0)	−2.2 (28.0)	3.0 (37.4)	9.5 (49.1)	15.2 (59.4)	19.8 (67.6)	22.9 (73.2)	22.0 (71.6)	16.9 (62.4)	10.3 (50.5)	3.1 (37.6)	−3.0 (26.6)	9.4 (48.9)
Record low °C (°F)	−19.8 (−3.6)	−15.3 (4.5)	−10.0 (14.0)	−2.9 (26.8)	2.7 (36.9)	9.6 (49.3)	15.8 (60.4)	13.3 (55.9)	6.3 (43.3)	−2.8 (27.0)	−10.3 (13.5)	−16.7 (1.9)	−19.8 (−3.6)
Average precipitation mm (inches)	6.3 (0.25)	11.7 (0.46)	14.8 (0.58)	31.7 (1.25)	54.7 (2.15)	91.5 (3.60)	216.9 (8.54)	198.6 (7.82)	66.7 (2.63)	28.4 (1.12)	25.4 (1.00)	9.3 (0.37)	756 (29.77)
Average precipitation days (≥ 0.1 mm)	2.6	3.4	3.3	5.2	6.6	8.2	12.2	11.9	7.5	5.0	4.5	3.1	73.5
Average snowy days	3.3	2.7	1.3	0.2	0	0	0	0	0	0	1.1	2.2	10.8
Average relative humidity (%)	58	56	51	52	57	63	77	79	71	65	65	61	63
Mean monthly sunshine hours	145.1	147.6	199.9	219.5	241.3	209.0	176.7	184.3	179.9	186.5	152.3	149.8	2,191.9
Percentage possible sunshine	47	48	54	56	55	48	40	45	49	54	50	50	50
Source: China Meteorological Administration

== Administrative divisions ==
As of 2012, this city is divided to 2 subdistricts, 17 towns and 1 township.

Subdistricts

- Qingyun Subdistrict (青云街道)
- Xinwen Subdistrict (新汶街道)

Towns

- Dongdu (东都镇)
- Xiaoxie (小协镇)
- Zhai (翟镇)
- Quangou (泉沟镇)
- Yangliu (羊流镇)
- Guodu (果都镇)
- Xizhangzhuang (西张庄镇)
- Tianbao (天宝镇)
- Loude (楼德镇)
- Yucun (禹村镇)
- Gongli (宫里镇)
- Guli (谷里镇)
- Shilai (石莱镇)
- Fangcheng (放城镇)
- Liudu (刘杜镇)
- Wennan (汶南镇)
- Longyan (龙廷镇)

Townships

- Daijiazhuang Township (岳家庄乡)

== Economy ==
Xintai is an important area of production of foods, vegetables and petroleum. There are about 1,600 million tons of coal deposits, other mineral deposits include quartz, limestone and clay. The industrial structure of Xintai is centered on energy, building materials, machines and chemical engineering. There are more than 1,000 corporations of industry and mining.

== Transport ==
The Cilai railway runs through the city. The Jinghu and the Boxu expressways converge there.

== Demographics ==
Historical population
Year	Pop.	±% p.a.
1996	1,280,000	—
2000	1,344,395	+1.23%
2010	1,315,942	−0.21%
