= Xiangyang District, Hegang =

Coordinates: 47°20′33″N 130°17′39″E

Xiangyang District, Hegang 向阳区
- District
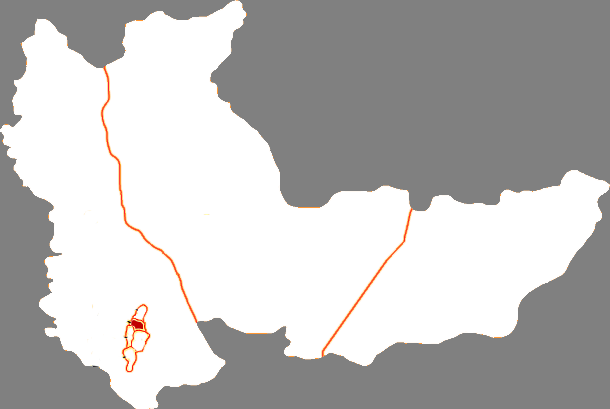
- Location of Xiangyang District in Hegang
- Country: People's Republic of China
- Province: Heilongjiang
- Prefecture-level city: Hegang
- District seat: Zhenxing Road (振兴路)

Area
  - Total: 8.2 km^{2} (3.2 sq mi)

Population (2011)
  - Total: 88,510
  - Density: 11,000/km^{2} (28,000/sq mi)
- Time zone: UTC+8 (China Standard)
- Postal code: 154100
- Website: hgxyq.gov.cn

Xiangyang District (simplified Chinese: 向阳区; traditional Chinese: 向陽區; pinyin: Xiàngyáng Qū) is a district of the city of Hegang, Heilongjiang province, China.

== Administrative divisions ==
Xiangyang District is divided into 5 subdistricts.

5 subdistricts

- Beishan (北山街道), Hongjun (红军街道), Guangming (光明街道), Shengli (胜利街道), Nanyi (南翼街道)
