= Heilongjiang Longmay Mining Holding Group Co., Ltd. =

Longmay Group
- Type: State Owned Enterprise
- Industry: Coal mining
- Founded: 1917
- Headquarters: Harbin, Heilongjiang, China
- Number of employees: 248,000 (as of 2014)
- Parent: Heilongjiang Government
- Website: www.longmay.com.cn

Heilongjiang Longmay Mining Holding Group Co., Ltd. is a state owned enterprise in China.

== Company ==
The company founded in 1917 is the largest coal miner in northeast China, an employer in Heilongjiang with 248,000 employees as of March 2014.

== Mining explosion ==
It was involved in a mining accident on November 21, 2009 near Hegang in Heilongjiang province, northeastern China, known as the 2009 Heilongjiang mine explosion.

== Restructuring and worker protests ==
Chinese Communist Party general secretary Xi Jinping ordered economic reforms in 2016 with plans to cut employment in the coal mining industry. Longmay was the subject of the protests and marches relating to delayed payments of workers, some of which who claimed in March 2016 they haven't been paid since October 2015. Longmay has announced it plans to lay off up to 100,000 workers.

Initially the Governor of Heilongjiang province Lu Hao said at a press conference at the 2016 National People's Congress: "Longmay has 80,000 workers down mines, and today, not one has not been paid monthly wages and their income hasn't fallen a penny." A week later Lu later reversed this statement and said he knowingly misstated the facts. "I had known that the aboveground workers had wages in arrears, but it's also true that the down shafts are also in arrears, and I spoke wrongly about that."
