= Hegang =

Hegang 鹤岗市
- Prefecture-level city
- Jindingshan Avenue Beiputuo Temple Hegang railway station New Century Plaza Ping'an Pagoda Xingshan Film Plaza Luobei County Mingshan Scenic Area Hegang skyline

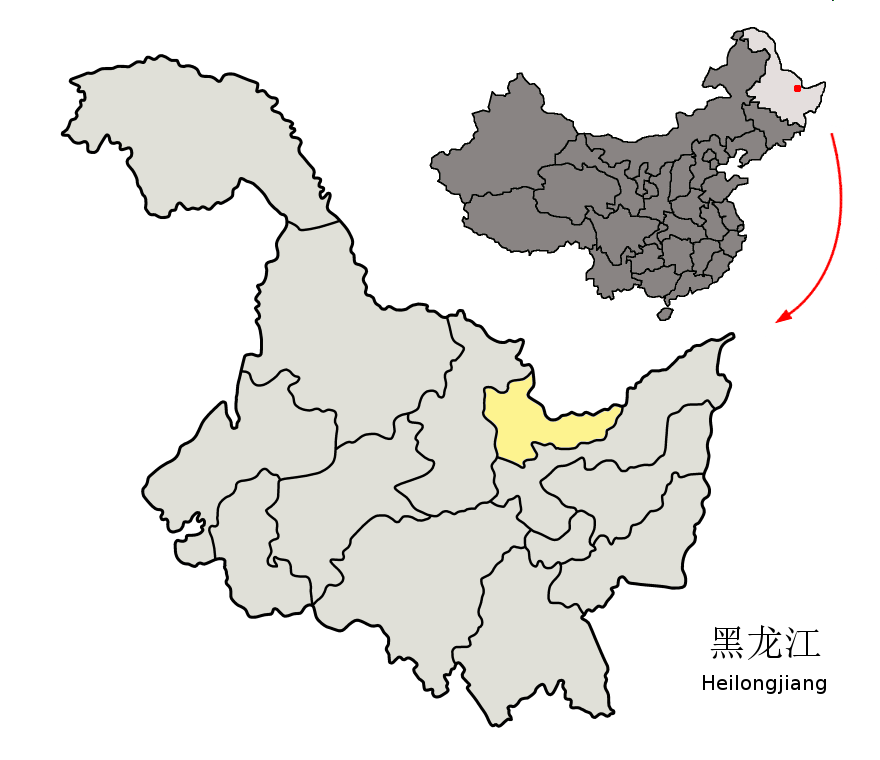
- Location of Hegang City (yellow) in Heilongjiang (light grey)

- Location of the city centre in Heilongjiang
- Coordinates (Hegang government): 47°21′00″N 130°17′53″E
- Country: People's Republic of China
- Province: Heilongjiang
- County-level divisions: 8
- Settled: 1906
- Municipal seat: Xiangyang District

Area
  - Prefecture-level city: 14,679.88 km^{2} (5,667.93 sq mi)
  - Urban: 4,574.9 km^{2} (1,766.4 sq mi)
  - Metro: 4,574.9 km^{2} (1,766.4 sq mi)
- Elevation: 280 m (920 ft)

Population (2020 census)
  - Prefecture-level city: 891,271
  - Density: 60.7138/km^{2} (157.248/sq mi)
  - Urban: 545,404
  - Urban density: 119.22/km^{2} (308.77/sq mi)
  - Metro: 545,404
  - Metro density: 119.22/km^{2} (308.77/sq mi)

GDP
  - Prefecture-level city: CN¥ 26.6 billion US$ 4.3 billion
  - Per capita: CN¥ 24,983; US$ 4,011
- Time zone: UTC+8 (China Standard)
- Postal code: 154100 - 154200
- Area code: 0468
- ISO 3166 code: CN-HL-04
- License plate prefixes: 黑H
- Climate: Dwb
- Website: www.hegang.gov.cn

Hegang
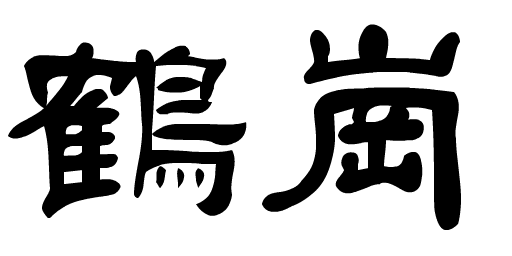
- "Hegang", as written in Chinese

Chinese name
- Simplified Chinese: 鹤岗
- Traditional Chinese: 鶴崗
Transcriptions
Standard Mandarin
- Hanyu Pinyin: Hègǎng

Manchu name
- Manchu script: ᡥᡝᡤᠠᠩ
- Romanization: Heg'ang

Russian name
- Russian: Хэган

Hegang (Chinese: 鹤岗; pinyin: Hègǎng, also known as Heli and Xingshan) is a prefecture-level city in Heilongjiang province of China, situated in the southeastern section of the Lesser Khingan Range, facing Jiamusi across the Songhua River to the south and Russia's Jewish Autonomous Oblast across the Amur River to the north. Hegang is one of the principal coal-producing cities in China. Hegang covers an administrative area of 14,679.88 km^{2} (5,667.93 sq mi) and according to the 2020 Chinese census, has a population of 891,271 inhabitants, of whom 545,404 lived in the built-up (or metro) area made of 6 urban districts. By the end of 2024, the total registered population of the city was estimated at 935,000, including 756,000 in urban areas.

== History ==
=== Early history ===
The region of Hegang was a desolate and uninhabited area until the late 1890s. In 1906, the area of Hegang City was under the administration of Tangyuan County under the Qing Dynasty. Since then, the government has been encouraging people to farm in the region. In 1914, a coalfield was discovered in Haoli, and Heilongjiang Government approved to set up Xinghua Mines (興華煤礦) which is jointly invested by merchants including Shen Songnian (沈松年). The area was also renamed Xingshan (興山) after the Xinghua Coal Mine. The Hegang mines were founded in 1916 by a Chinese entrepreneur with Russian capital. Hegang has witnessed rapid economic growth thanks to its rich coal resources. In 1926 a railway was built between Hegang and Jiamusi, some 30 miles to the south on the Songhua River. A coal carrier fleet was privately financed in 1930 by General Zhang Xueliang. In August 1932, Hegang mines were occupied by the Japanese as the Japanese Empire advanced through Manchuria. The mines were further developed during the Japanese occupation of Manchuria. On August 11, 1945, Hegang was occupied by the Soviet Red Army, and was relegated to the Communist Force. Since several major coal mines in southern Manchuria were controlled by Kuomintang Forces, Hegang became one of the main coal-producing area of Communist Force in the Chinese Civil-War, playing an important role in guaranteeing the acquisition of weapons and other war materials. Hegang was renamed in 1949, and set up as a prefecture-level city in Heilongjiang.

=== People's Republic of China ===
After 1949 the city experienced further rapid growth. The mines were extended and modernized, and their annual output increased dramatically. Most of the coal is high-quality coking coal that is also used to make coal gas; apart from a small quantity consumed in Jiamusi, the bulk of it is shipped by rail to Anyang, Henan and to other industrial cities such as Anshan and Benxi in Liaoning. By the late 1950s the coal industry employed more than 80 percent of the working population. Although the mines continued to be developed and output increased, Hegang's industrial activity was beginning to diversify, especially after a large thermal-power-generating installation was constructed by the early 1970s. By 2021 the city's mining industry was in decline.

== Geography ==
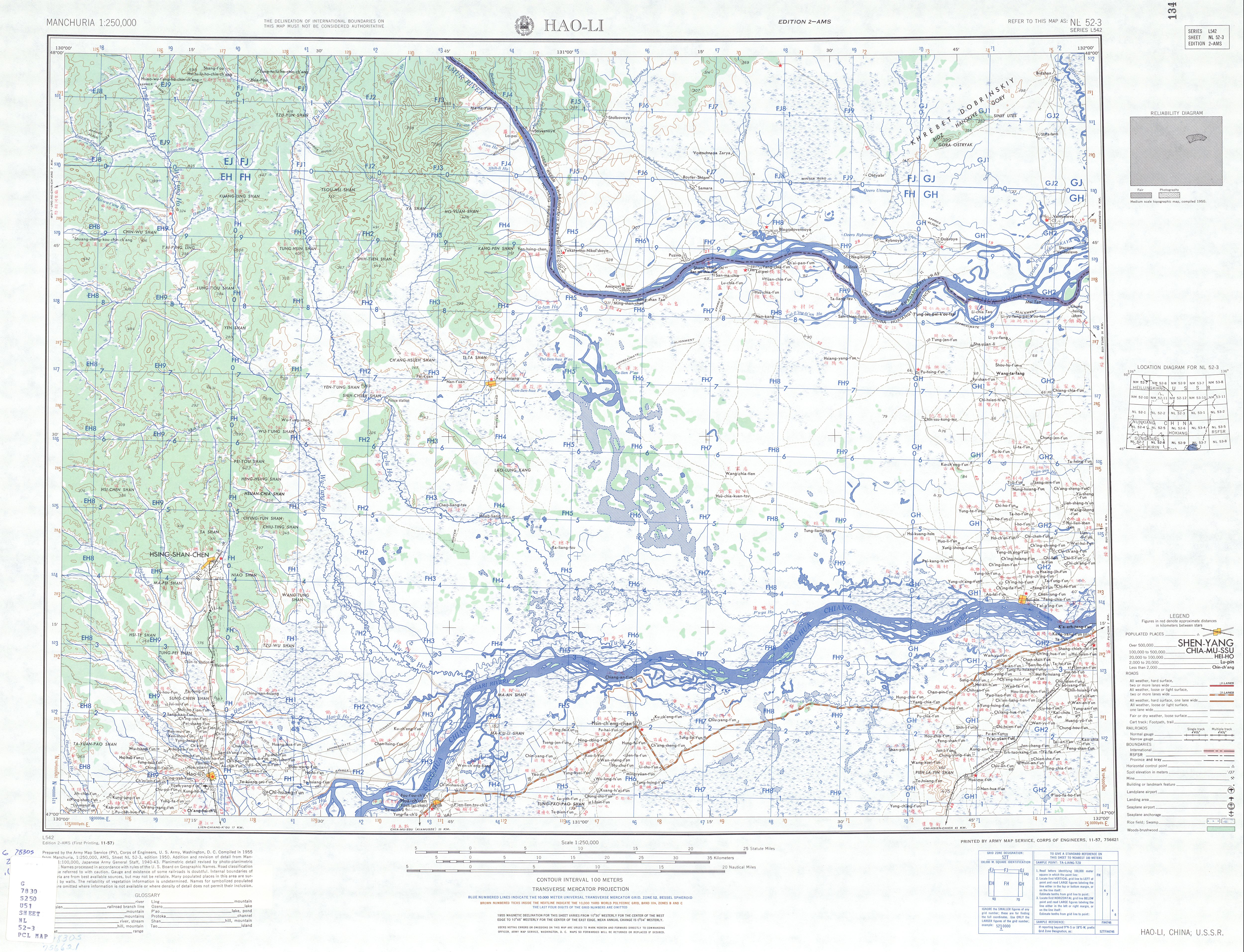
Hegang (Hao-li 鶴立) (1955)

Hegang is located in the northeast part of Heilongjiang province, spanning from latitude 47° 04′−48° 9′ N to longitude 129° 40′−132° 31' E. Bordering prefecture-level cities are:

- Jiamusi (SE)
- Yichun (W)

The region also faces Russia's Jewish Autonomous Oblast across the Amur River with an international border of 235 kilometres (146 mi). Lesser Khingan Mountains crosses the city. The total administrative area of Hegang is 14,648 square kilometres (5,656 sq mi). Amur river and Songhua river are the main rivers in Hegang.

=== Climate ===
Hegang has a humid continental climate (Köppen Dwb/Dwa), with long, bitterly cold, but dry winters, and humid and warm summers. The monthly 24-hour average temperature ranges from −16.6 °C (2 °F) in January to 21.7 °C (71.1 °F) in July, and the annual mean is 3.8 °C (38.8 °F). Close to 2/3 of the annual precipitation falls in the months of June thru August. The average annual precipitation is about 600-650 mm, mainly concentrated in summer, and the precipitation from June to August accounts for about 60% of the total annual precipitation. Extreme temperatures have ranged from −38.5 to 37.7 °C.

Climate data for Hegang, elevation 182 m (597 ft), (1991–2020 normals, extremes 1971–2010)
Month	Jan	Feb	Mar	Apr	May	Jun	Jul	Aug	Sep	Oct	Nov	Dec	Year
Record high °C (°F)	1.5 (34.7)	7.7 (45.9)	19.0 (66.2)	29.4 (84.9)	33.5 (92.3)	36.8 (98.2)	37.7 (99.9)	34.9 (94.8)	31.8 (89.2)	25.8 (78.4)	14.3 (57.7)	4.8 (40.6)	37.7 (99.9)
Mean daily maximum °C (°F)	−11.8 (10.8)	−6.9 (19.6)	1.0 (33.8)	11.5 (52.7)	19.4 (66.9)	23.9 (75.0)	26.6 (79.9)	25.0 (77.0)	19.9 (67.8)	10.6 (51.1)	−2.1 (28.2)	−11.2 (11.8)	8.8 (47.9)
Daily mean °C (°F)	−16.9 (1.6)	−12.6 (9.3)	−4.3 (24.3)	5.8 (42.4)	13.6 (56.5)	18.7 (65.7)	21.9 (71.4)	20.2 (68.4)	14.2 (57.6)	5.3 (41.5)	−6.8 (19.8)	−15.7 (3.7)	3.6 (38.5)
Mean daily minimum °C (°F)	−21.1 (−6.0)	−17.8 (0.0)	−9.7 (14.5)	0.1 (32.2)	7.7 (45.9)	13.8 (56.8)	17.6 (63.7)	16.0 (60.8)	9.1 (48.4)	0.4 (32.7)	−10.8 (12.6)	−19.5 (−3.1)	−1.2 (29.9)
Record low °C (°F)	−38.5 (−37.3)	−32.6 (−26.7)	−26.1 (−15.0)	−13.0 (8.6)	−4.5 (23.9)	5.0 (41.0)	10.1 (50.2)	7.1 (44.8)	−2.4 (27.7)	−15.7 (3.7)	−26.5 (−15.7)	−32.7 (−26.9)	−38.5 (−37.3)
Average precipitation mm (inches)	4.7 (0.19)	5.5 (0.22)	15.5 (0.61)	28.3 (1.11)	68.2 (2.69)	118.3 (4.66)	152.6 (6.01)	154.8 (6.09)	70.5 (2.78)	31.7 (1.25)	13.6 (0.54)	9.1 (0.36)	672.8 (26.51)
Average precipitation days (≥ 0.1 mm)	5.1	4.1	5.7	7.6	11.8	14.5	15.1	15.0	11.1	6.9	5.6	6.6	109.1
Average snowy days	8.1	6.3	8.9	4.7	0.2	0	0	0	0	2.9	8.2	9.8	49.1
Average relative humidity (%)	63	57	52	50	56	71	77	78	69	58	60	65	63
Mean monthly sunshine hours	172.6	200.5	237.4	215.8	219.3	197.2	194.2	196.1	209.3	189.7	154.4	145.6	2,332.1
Percentage possible sunshine	62	69	64	53	47	42	41	45	56	57	56	56	54
Source 1: China Meteorological Administration
Source 2: Weather China

== Subdivisions ==
The prefecture-level city of Hegang is divided into 6 districts and 2 counties. The information presented here uses the metric system and data from the 2010 Census.

Map
#	English name	Hanzi	Pinyin	Area	Population	Density
1	Xingshan District	兴山区	Xīngshān Qū	27	44,803	1,659
2	Xiangyang District	向阳区	Xiàngyáng Qū	9	110,916	12,324
3	Gongnong District	工农区	Gōngnóng Qū	11	140,070	12,734
4	Nanshan District	南山区	Nánshān Qū	30	119,047	3,968
5	Xing'an District	兴安区	Xīng'ān Qū	27	74,396	2,755
6	Dongshan District	东山区	Dōngshān Qū	4,575	175,239	38
7	Luobei County	萝北县	Luóběi Xiàn	6,761	220,131	33
8	Suibin County	绥滨县	Suíbīn Xiàn	3,344	174,063	52

== Demographics ==
Per the 2020 Chinese Census, Hegang has a population of 891,271, down 15.81% from the 1,058,665 recorded in the 2010 Chinese Census. There were 417,337 households, with an average household size of 2.14 people. There were 445,771 males and 445,500 females, giving the city a sex ratio of 100.06 males per 100 females. 77,421 people in Hegang were aged 0-14 (8.69% of its total population), 597,050 people were aged 15-59 (66.99%), and 216,800 people were aged 60 and above (24.32%), of which 146,649 were aged 65 and above (16.45%). Hegang is highly urbanized, with 736,416 people living in urban areas (82.63% of its total population), while 154,855 people live in rural areas (17.37%).

== Economy ==
In 2010, Hegang's GDP grew 16.1% to RMB 25.1 billion, ranking tenth among 13 prefectures and prefecture-level cities in the province. However, through the late 2010s into the early 2020s, its economy began to decline, in part due to its economic reliance on coal. Its population declined about 17% from 2013 to 2020, and its real estate market began struggling significantly, with rentals in some cases going for solely the cost of heating and property management fees. Local government revenue also began to shrink, leading the city in 2021 to undergo a fiscal restructuring plan, and to implement a hiring freeze.

Heavy industry dominates the city's industrial sector, with coal mining in particular being prominent. As of July 2024, Hegang hosts 39 coal mines, with an annual production capacity of 18 million tons. Other sizable mineral deposits in Hegang include graphite, clay, and silica.

Hegang also has sizable agricultural and animal husbandry industries. The city's agricultural industry is largely centered on the production of rice, maize, and soybeans. Common livestock in Hegang include dairy cows, pigs, chickens, and geese.

Other major industries in the city include agricultural products processing, food and beverage, dairy products, pharmaceuticals, and the production and supply of electricity.

=== Mining accidents ===
Two major mining accidents have occurred near the city. In September 2008, there was a fire at Fuhua Coal Mine, owned by Fuhua Mining Co., Ltd. It was caused by spontaneous combustion of coal. 31 miners died (19 deaths, 12 missing). In November 2009, there was a gas explosion at Xinxing coal mine, owned by Heilongjiang Longmay Mining Holding Group. Out of 528 workers, 420 miners were rescued and over 100 miners died. Of the 60 hospitalised survivors, they had broken bones, gas poisoning or respiratory injuries.

== Education ==
By the end of 2019, Hegang had one full-time higher education school that is Hegang Normal College. with 2,926 students and 915 graduates. There are 7 specialized secondary schools, with 5,629 students and 1,464 graduates. There are 50 general secondary schools, with 37,982 students and 14,886 graduates. There are 36 primary schools with 29,771 students and 4,427 graduates. There is 1 special education school with 191 students. There are 144 kindergartens, with 12,045 children in attendance.

Hegang No.1 High School is located in the city. Hegang No. 1 Middle School was founded in March 1950 and has a long history of 60 years.

== Transport ==
The Yichun-Hegang Highway, the Jiamusi-Hegang Highway and the Hegang-Luobei Highway form a comprehensive highway network within the city. It takes less than four hours to drive from Hegang to Harbin, the provincial capital of Heilongjiang Province. Luobei Port, which is within a one-hour drive from Hegang, is a major port on the Amur River. Jiamusi Airport, a one-hour drive from Hegang, operates flights to Beijing, Dalian and other major cities domestically.

A new Luobei Airport is scheduled to open in 2027.

== Sister cities ==
- Birobidzhan, Jewish Autonomous Oblast, Russia

== Notable people ==
- Qin Yuhai - Chinese politician and photographer. He was a former Mayor of Hegang (1997-1998).
- Li Yunfeng - Chinese athlete, coach, and politician
- Liu Jiayu - Chinese athlete
- Yin Shoukun-Member of Chinese Calligraphers Association
