= Gongnong District =

Gongnong 工农区
- District
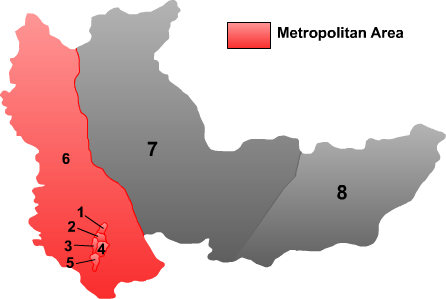
- Location of Gongnong ("3") within Hegang City

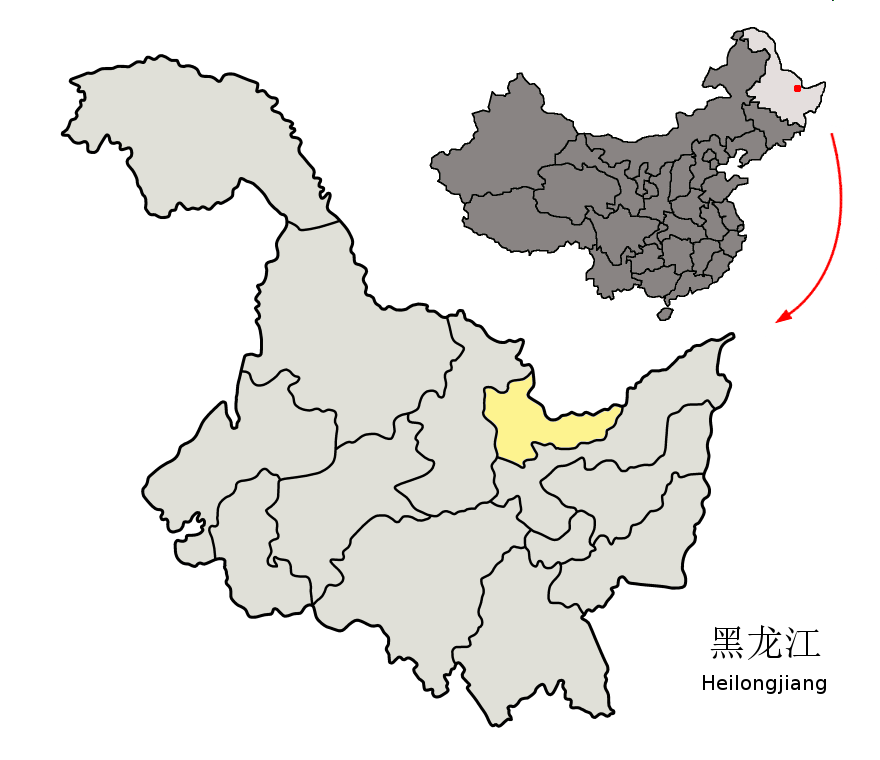
- Location of Hegang City in Heilongjiang
- Coordinates: 47°14′27″N 130°10′47″E
- Country: People's Republic of China
- Province: Heilongjiang
- Prefecture-level city: Hegang

Area
  - Total: 11 km^{2} (4.2 sq mi)

Population (2003)
  - Total: 140,070
  - Density: 13,000/km^{2} (33,000/sq mi)
- Time zone: UTC+8 (China Standard)

Gongnong District (simplified Chinese: 工农区; traditional Chinese: 工農區; pinyin: Gōngnóng Qū) is a district of the city of Hegang, Heilongjiang province, People's Republic of China.

== Administrative divisions ==
Gongnong District is divided into 6 subdistricts.

6 subdistricts

- Yucai (育才街道), Hongqi (红旗街道), Xinnan (新南街道), Hubin (湖滨街道), Jiefang (解放街道), Tuanjie (团结街道)
