= 2013 Taozigou Coal Mine explosion =

Mining disaster in Sichuan, China

- Date: May 11, 2013
- Location: Sichuan, People's Republic of China
- Deaths: 28 dead
- Injuries: 18 injured

The 2013 Taozigou Coal Mine explosion occurred in the Taozigou Coal Mine (桃子沟煤矿) in Hua'an Village (华安村), Fuji Town (福集镇) Lu County, Sichuan, China. A total of 28 people lost their lives in the explosion. The explosion was reportedly a result of illegal mining.

The explosion occurred on May 11, 2013 at about 14:15. A total of 108 people were working underground when the explosion occurred, many from outside Sichuan Province. 27 people died and 81 were saved. However, one of the people saved died of his injuries later. In total, the explosion caused 28 deaths.

Illegal mining was blamed for the explosion. The miners were working without a ventilation system when the explosion occurred. It was reported that all licenses for the coal mine would be revoked and the site would be shut down permanently.
