= 2007 Shandong coal mine flood =

Mining disaster in Shandong, China

- Date: August 17, 2007
- Time: 1:50 UTC
- Location: Xintai, Shandong, China
- Deaths: 172 ~ 181

The 2007 Shandong coal mine flood was an incident that occurred on August 17, 2007 in Xintai, Shandong, People's Republic of China, when heavy rain caused a river to burst a levee creating a flood into two mine shafts. By 8:50 am (1:50 UTC), the mine was inundated underwater.

== Damages and casualties ==
More than 200mm of rain had fallen in Xintai, causing a 50-metre breach of a levee of the Wen river. Water poured into the 860-metre deep pit at the Huayuan mine, quickly overwhelming the mine's pumps. The 172 miners were trapped in a 3,000-foot-deep mine shaft when a mine operated by the Huayuan Mining Co. Nine others were also missing, in a nearby mine run by a different company. None of the 181 miners, living or dead, were recovered from the two mines after the accident.

The Huayuan mine was flooded with an estimated 12 million cubic metres of water. If all six available pumps were used around the clock, they could pump out about 120,000 cubic metres of water a day, but only four were operational. Unofficially, experts say that it would take almost 100 days to drain the water inside the mine.

== Aftermath ==
An official at China.com.cn discussed the fact that signs of flooding had appeared in advance prior to the incident, and that the "disaster was completely avoidable." On September 6, the Shandong provincial government issued a statement citing scientists who said that none of the miners would be able to make it out alive after that amount of time underground.

== See also ==
- Coal power in China
