= 2018 Shandong mine collapse =

Collapse of a mining tunnel in the Shandong province in China

- Date: 20 October 2018
- Location: Shandong province, China
- Cause: Rock burst

On 20 October 2018, a rock burst destroyed part of a mining tunnel in the Shandong province in China.

== Incidents ==
External videos
- Shandong Mine Collapse: Review of the Month-Long Rescue

A rock burst destroyed part of a mining tunnel, in a spontaneous fracture of the rock, while 334 miners were working in the coal mine. The collapse took place around 11:00 pm local time and destroyed part of a water drainage tunnel. Two people were initially killed by the falling rocks. Most of the workers managed to escape, but 18 workers were trapped underground.

Ventilation was returned quickly to around 200 meters of the damaged tunnel. On 26 October it was reported that the trapped miners were discovered 242 feet below the surface.

== Victims ==
Two miners were killed in the initial disaster, but the death toll raised to 11 on 27 October.

== See also ==
- List of coal mining accidents in China
