= 2013 Machang Coal Mine outburst =

Mining disaster in Guizhou, China

- Date: 12 March 2013
- Location: Guizhou, People's Republic of China
- Deaths: 25 dead

The 2013 Machang Coal Mine outburst occurred in Machang Coal Mine (马场煤矿) in Shuicheng County, Guizhou, China. A total of 25 people lost their lives in the accident.

== Location ==
Machang Coal Mine is located in Shuicheng, Liupanshui, Guizhou. The mine belongs to Gemudi Company (格目底矿业公司) of Guizhou Water & Mining Group (贵州水矿集团). The coal and gas outburst occurred on 12 March 2013 at about 20:00 local time. At the time of the outburst, there were 83 workers working underground, and 58 of them managed to leave safely. Most of the 25 people who died in the accident were locals from Guizhou.
