= Babao seal paste =

Traditional Chinese handicraft

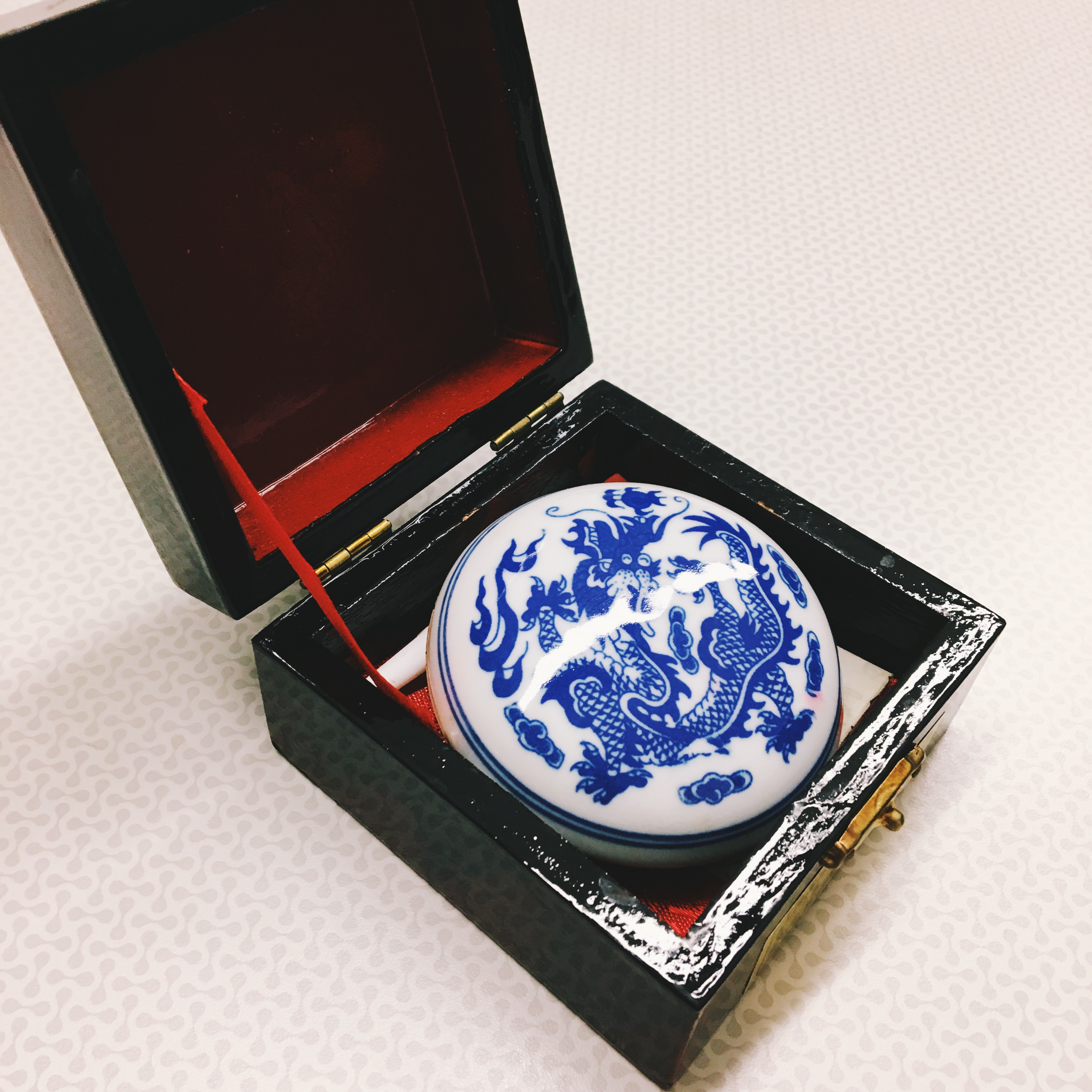
Babao seal paste

Babao seal paste (simplified Chinese: 八宝印泥; traditional Chinese: 八寶印泥; Pe̍h-ōe-jī: Poeh pó ìn-nî) is a traditional handicraft made in Zhangzhou, Fujian, China. It dates to the Qing Dynasty and is honoured as one of Zhangzhou's "Three Precious Treasures". In 1983, its recipe was guarded as "top secret" by the Chinese Ministry of Light Industry. Babao seal paste was added to the National Intangible Cultural Heritage List in 2008 and the China Time-honored Brand list by the Chinese Ministry of Commerce in 2011.

== Characteristics ==
Babao seal paste is made from eight precious materials: musk, pearl, rhesus macaque bezoar, agate, coral, gold, borneolum and amber. These ingredients are ground into a powder, with additional materials, before processing by a secret technique. The finished product is available in six grades. Babao seal paste is characterized by its bright color and good aroma. It is also fire and water-resistant.

Three main traditional studios make seal paste in Zhangzhou: Xiling Seal Art Society in Hangzhou, Zhejiang Province; Rongbaozhai in Beijing; and Babao Workshop in Zhangzhou, Fujian Province. They rank it top among other seal paste brands in China.

== History ==
Babao seal paste has its origins in 1673 during the Qing Dynasty. Zhangzhou Yuanfeng Drugstore owner Wei Chang’an (Chinese: 魏長安/魏长安) combined the eight ingredients of the paste to make an ointment he called Babao. Due to its high cost, the ointment was not widely used at that time. After using the ointment on his art and discovering its impressive color, Changan repurposed the mixture as Babao seal paste.

In 1746, local government official named Si Da gave Babao seal paste a name called Lihua Workshop. The paste was sent to the royal palace as a tribute, and the Qianlong Emperor often bestowed it on his ministers. Royal favor helped popularize Babao seal paste in Chinese culture. Babao seal paste won a special award at the 1910 Nanyang Commodity Exposition and won the first prize at the 1915 Panama–Pacific International Exposition. During the Second Sino-Japanese War, the paste was sent to US President Franklin D. Roosevelt as a national present.
