= 2013 Babao Coal Mine explosions =

Mining disasters in Jilin, China

- Date: March 29 and April 1, 2013
- Location: Jilin, People's Republic of China
- Deaths: 53 dead

The 2013 Babao Coal Mine explosions occurred in the Babao Coal Mine (八宝煤矿) in Jiangyuan District of the Baishan City, Jilin, China. A total of 53 people lost their lives in the explosions. The Babao Coal Mine is a state-owned colliery under the Tonghua Mining (Group) Co., Ltd.

The first explosion occurred on March 29, 2013 at about 22:36 local time. The explosion caused 36 people dead. 13 people were rescued. The original report of the first explosion was found to have hidden the death of 7 people.

The second explosion occurred on April 1, 2013 at about 10:00 local time. Preliminary report said that 6 people died and 11 were missing in the explosion. Later news coverage reported that all the 17 people had died in the explosion. It was reported that the second accident occurred when a rescue team was despatched without waiting for instructions and having a sound plan and should have been preventable.
