= Xingshan District =

Xingshan District 兴山区
- District
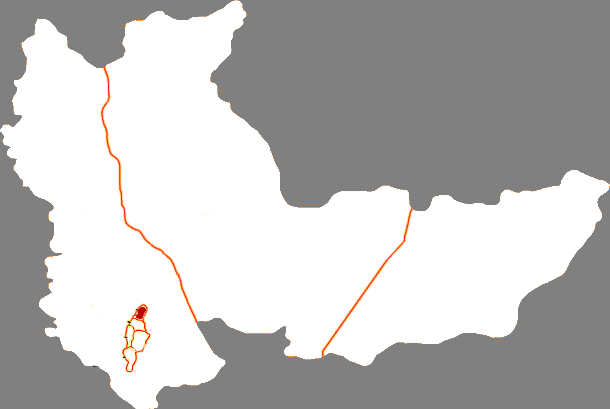
- Xingshan in Hegang

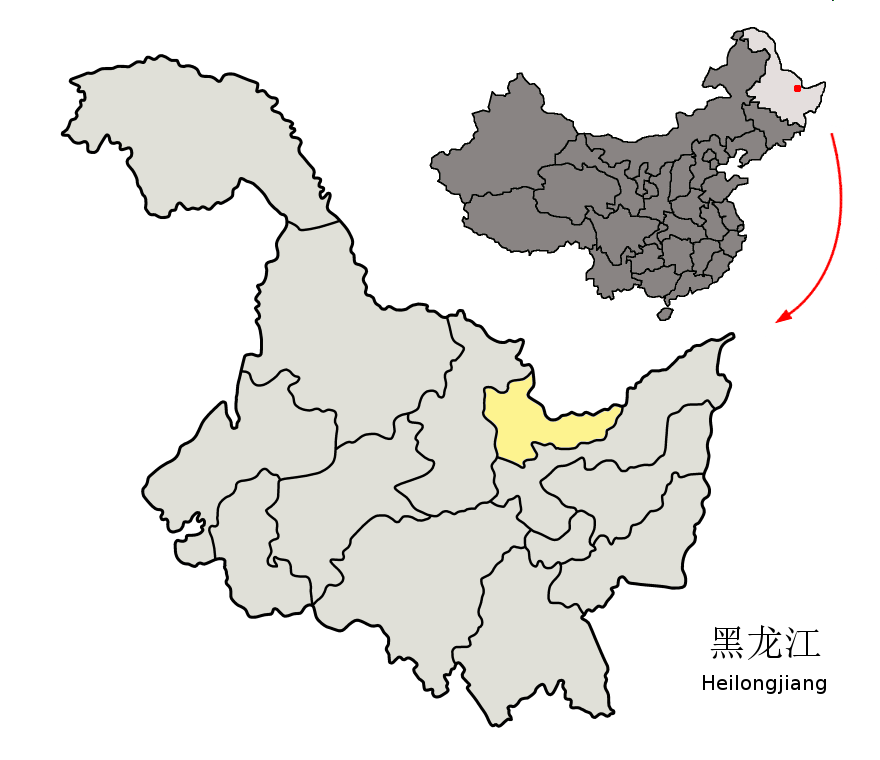
- Hegang in Heilongjiang
- Coordinates: 47°21′28″N 130°17′35″E
- Country: China
- Province: Heilongjiang
- Prefecture-level city: Hegang
- District seat: Gounan Subdistrict

Area
  - Total: 26 km^{2} (10 sq mi)

Population (2020 census)
  - Total: 21,125
  - Density: 810/km^{2} (2,100/sq mi)
- Time zone: UTC+8 (China Standard)
- Postal code: 154100
- Website: www.hgxs.gov.cn

Xingshan District (simplified Chinese: 兴山区; traditional Chinese: 興山區; pinyin: Xìngshān Qū) is a district of the city of Hegang, Heilongjiang province, China.

== Administrative divisions ==
Xingshan District is divided into 4 subdistricts:

Lingbei (岭北街道), Lingnan (岭南街道), Goubei (沟北街道), Gounan (沟南街道)
