= List of administrative divisions of Jilin =

Jilin Province
- Province
- Capital: Changchun

Prefecture-level divisions
- Sub-provincial cities: 1
- Prefectural cities: 7
- Autonomous prefectures: 1

County level divisions
- County cities: 20
- Counties: 16
- Autonomous counties: 3
- Districts: 21

Township level divisions
- Towns: 427
- Townships: 312
- Ethnic townships / towns^{*}: 32
- Subdistricts: 252

Villages level divisions
- Communities: 1,875
- Administrative villages: 9,327

Jilin, a province of the People's Republic of China, is made up of the following administrative divisions.

== Administrative divisions ==
All of these administrative divisions are explained in greater detail at administrative divisions of China. This chart lists all prefecture-level and county-level divisions of Jilin.

Prefecture level	County Level				
Prefecture level	Name	Chinese	Hanyu Pinyin	Division code	
Changchun city 长春市; Chángchūn Shì (Capital – Sub-provincial) (2201 / CGQ)	Nanguan District	南关区	Nánguān Qū	220102	NGN
Changchun city 长春市; Chángchūn Shì (Capital – Sub-provincial) (2201 / CGQ)	Kuancheng District	宽城区	Kuānchéng Qū	220103	KCQ
Changchun city 长春市; Chángchūn Shì (Capital – Sub-provincial) (2201 / CGQ)	Chaoyang District	朝阳区	Cháoyáng Qū	220104	CYC
Changchun city 长春市; Chángchūn Shì (Capital – Sub-provincial) (2201 / CGQ)	Erdao District	二道区	Èrdào Qū	220105	EDQ
Changchun city 长春市; Chángchūn Shì (Capital – Sub-provincial) (2201 / CGQ)	Luyuan District	绿园区	Lùyuán Qū (Note: not Lǜyuán)	220106	LYQ
Changchun city 长春市; Chángchūn Shì (Capital – Sub-provincial) (2201 / CGQ)	Shuangyang District	双阳区	Shuāngyáng Qū	220112	SYQ
Changchun city 长春市; Chángchūn Shì (Capital – Sub-provincial) (2201 / CGQ)	Jiutai District	九台区	Jiǔtái Qū	220113	JTI
Changchun city 长春市; Chángchūn Shì (Capital – Sub-provincial) (2201 / CGQ)	Nong'an County	农安县	Nóng'ān Xiàn	220122	NAJ
Changchun city 长春市; Chángchūn Shì (Capital – Sub-provincial) (2201 / CGQ)	Yushu city	榆树市	Yúshù Shì	220182	YSS
Changchun city 长春市; Chángchūn Shì (Capital – Sub-provincial) (2201 / CGQ)	Dehui city	德惠市	Déhuì Shì	220183	DEH
Changchun city 长春市; Chángchūn Shì (Capital – Sub-provincial) (2201 / CGQ)	Gongzhuling city	公主岭市	Gōngzhǔlǐng Shì	220184	GZL
Jilin city 吉林市; Jílín Shì (2202 / JLS)	Changyi District	昌邑区	Chāngyì Qū	220202	CYI
Jilin city 吉林市; Jílín Shì (2202 / JLS)	Longtan District	龙潭区	Lóngtán Qū	220203	LTQ
Jilin city 吉林市; Jílín Shì (2202 / JLS)	Chuanying District	船营区	Chuányíng Qū	220204	CYJ
Jilin city 吉林市; Jílín Shì (2202 / JLS)	Fengman District	丰满区	Fēngmǎn Qū	220211	FMQ
Jilin city 吉林市; Jílín Shì (2202 / JLS)	Yongji County	永吉县	Yǒngjí Xiàn	220221	YOJ
Jilin city 吉林市; Jílín Shì (2202 / JLS)	Jiaohe city	蛟河市	Jiāohé Shì	220281	JHJ
Jilin city 吉林市; Jílín Shì (2202 / JLS)	Huadian city	桦甸市	Huàdiàn Shì	220282	HDJ
Jilin city 吉林市; Jílín Shì (2202 / JLS)	Shulan city	舒兰市	Shūlán Shì	220283	SLN
Jilin city 吉林市; Jílín Shì (2202 / JLS)	Panshi city	磐石市	Pánshí Shì	220284	PSI
Siping city 四平市; Sìpíng Shì (2203 / SPS)	Tiexi District	铁西区	Tiěxī Qū	220302	TXS
Siping city 四平市; Sìpíng Shì (2203 / SPS)	Tiedong District	铁东区	Tiědōng Qū	220303	TDQ
Siping city 四平市; Sìpíng Shì (2203 / SPS)	Lishu County	梨树县	Líshù Xiàn	220322	LSU
Siping city 四平市; Sìpíng Shì (2203 / SPS)	Yitong County (Note: Conventional name: Yitong Manchu Autonomous County; Chinese: 伊通满族自治县; pinyin: Yītōng Mǎnzú Zìzhìxiàn)	伊通县	Yītōng Xiàn	220323	YTO
Siping city 四平市; Sìpíng Shì (2203 / SPS)	Shuangliao city	双辽市	Shuāngliáo Shì	220382	SLS
Liaoyuan city 辽源市; Liáoyuán Shì (2204 / LYH)	Longshan District	龙山区	Lóngshān Qū	220402	LGS
Liaoyuan city 辽源市; Liáoyuán Shì (2204 / LYH)	Xi'an District	西安区	Xī'ān Qū	220403	XAA
Liaoyuan city 辽源市; Liáoyuán Shì (2204 / LYH)	Dongfeng County	东丰县	Dōngfēng Xiàn	220421	DGF
Liaoyuan city 辽源市; Liáoyuán Shì (2204 / LYH)	Dongliao County	东辽县	Dōngliáo Xiàn	220422	DLX
Tonghua city 通化市; Tōnghuà Shì (2205 / THS)	Dongchang District	东昌区	Dōngchāng Qū	220502	DCT
Tonghua city 通化市; Tōnghuà Shì (2205 / THS)	Erdaojiang District	二道江区	Èrdàojiāng Qū	220503	EDJ
Tonghua city 通化市; Tōnghuà Shì (2205 / THS)	Tonghua County	通化县	Tōnghuà Xiàn	220521	THX
Tonghua city 通化市; Tōnghuà Shì (2205 / THS)	Huinan County	辉南县	Huīnán Xiàn	220523	HNA
Tonghua city 通化市; Tōnghuà Shì (2205 / THS)	Liuhe County	柳河县	Liǔhé Xiàn	220524	LHC
Tonghua city 通化市; Tōnghuà Shì (2205 / THS)	Meihekou city	梅河口市	Méihékǒu Shì	220581	MHK
Tonghua city 通化市; Tōnghuà Shì (2205 / THS)	Ji'an city	集安市	Jí'ān Shì	220582	KNC
Baishan city 白山市; Báishān Shì (2206 / BSN)	Hunjiang District	浑江区	Húnjiāng Qū	220602	HJH
Baishan city 白山市; Báishān Shì (2206 / BSN)	Jiangyuan District	江源区	Jiāngyuán Qū	220605	JYT
Baishan city 白山市; Báishān Shì (2206 / BSN)	Fusong County	抚松县	Fǔsōng Xiàn	220621	FSG
Baishan city 白山市; Báishān Shì (2206 / BSN)	Jingyu County	靖宇县	Jìngyǔ Xiàn	220622	JYJ
Baishan city 白山市; Báishān Shì (2206 / BSN)	Changbai County (Note: Conventional name: Changbai Korean Autonomous County; Chinese: 长白朝鲜族自治县; pinyin: Chángbái Cháoxiǎnzú Zìzhìxiàn)	长白县	Chángbái Xiàn	220623	CGB
Baishan city 白山市; Báishān Shì (2206 / BSN)	Linjiang city	临江市	Línjiāng Shì	220681	LIN
Songyuan city 松原市; Sōngyuán Shì (2207 / SYU)	Ningjiang District	宁江区	Níngjiāng Qū	220702	NJA
Songyuan city 松原市; Sōngyuán Shì (2207 / SYU)	Qianguorluosi County (Note: Conventional name: Qian Gorlos Mongol Autonomous County; Chinese: 前郭尔罗斯蒙古族自治县; pinyin: Qiánguō'ěrluósī Měnggǔzú Zìzhìxiàn)	前郭尔罗斯县	Qiánguō'ěrluósī Xiàn	220721	QGO
Songyuan city 松原市; Sōngyuán Shì (2207 / SYU)	Changling County	长岭县	Chánglǐng Xiàn	220722	CLG
Songyuan city 松原市; Sōngyuán Shì (2207 / SYU)	Qian'an County	乾安县	Qián'ān Xiàn	220723	QAJ
Songyuan city 松原市; Sōngyuán Shì (2207 / SYU)	Fuyu city	扶余市	Fúyú Shì	220781	FYA
Baicheng city 白城市; Báichéng Shì (2208 / BCS)	Taobei District	洮北区	Táoběi Qū	220802	TBQ
Baicheng city 白城市; Báichéng Shì (2208 / BCS)	Zhenlai County	镇赉县	Zhènlài Xiàn	220821	ZLA
Baicheng city 白城市; Báichéng Shì (2208 / BCS)	Tongyu County	通榆县	Tōngyú Xiàn	220822	TGY
Baicheng city 白城市; Báichéng Shì (2208 / BCS)	Taonan city	洮南市	Táonán Shì	220881	TNS
Baicheng city 白城市; Báichéng Shì (2208 / BCS)	Da'an city	大安市	Dà'ān Shì	220882	DAN
Yanbian Prefecture (Note: Conventional name: Yanbian Korean Autonomous Prefecture; Chinese: 延边朝鲜族自治州; pinyin: Yánbiān Cháoxiǎnzú Zìzhìzhōu) 延边州; Yánbiān Zhōu (2224 / YBZ)	Yanji city	延吉市	Yánjí Shì	222401	YNJ
Yanbian Prefecture 延边州; Yánbiān Zhōu (2224 / YBZ)	Tumen city	图们市	Túmén Shì	222402	TME
Yanbian Prefecture 延边州; Yánbiān Zhōu (2224 / YBZ)	Dunhua city	敦化市	Dūnhuà Shì	222403	DHS
Yanbian Prefecture 延边州; Yánbiān Zhōu (2224 / YBZ)	Hunchun city	珲春市	Húnchūn Shì	222404	HUC
Yanbian Prefecture 延边州; Yánbiān Zhōu (2224 / YBZ)	Longjing city	龙井市	Lóngjǐng Shì	222405	LJJ
Yanbian Prefecture 延边州; Yánbiān Zhōu (2224 / YBZ)	Helong city	和龙市	Hélóng Shì	222406	HEL
Yanbian Prefecture 延边州; Yánbiān Zhōu (2224 / YBZ)	Wangqing County	汪清县	Wāngqīng Xiàn	222424	WGQ
Yanbian Prefecture 延边州; Yánbiān Zhōu (2224 / YBZ)	Antu County	安图县	Āntú Xiàn	222426	ATU

== Recent changes in administrative divisions ==
Date	Before	After	Note	Reference
1976-01-22	parts of Liaoyuan (PC-City)	Dongliao County	established	
1979-05-30	parts of Jilin Province	Inner Mongolia A.R.	provincial transferred	
1979-05-30	parts of Baicheng Prefecture	Hulunbuir League	transferred	
1979-05-30	↳ Tuquan County	↳ Tuquan County	transferred	
1979-05-30	↳ Horqin Right Front Banner	↳ Horqin Right Front Banner	transferred	
1979-05-30	Jirem League	Jirem League	transferred	
1979-05-30	↳ Tongliao County	↳ Tongliao County	transferred	
1979-05-30	↳ Kailu County	↳ Kailu County	transferred	
1979-05-30	↳ Naiman Banner	↳ Naiman Banner	transferred	
1979-05-30	↳ Hure Banner	↳ Hure Banner	transferred	
1979-05-30	↳ Jarud Banner	↳ Jarud Banner	transferred	
1979-05-30	↳ Horqin Left Middle Banner	↳ Horqin Left Middle Banner	transferred	
1979-05-30	↳ Horqin Right Middle Banner	↳ Horqin Right Middle Banner	transferred	
1979-05-30	↳ Horqin Left Back Banner	↳ Horqin Left Back Banner	transferred	
1979-05-30	↳ Tongliao (PC-City)	↳ Tongliao (PC-City)	transferred	
1980-01-29	Dongliao County	Liaoyuan (PC-City)	reorganized	
1982-08-02	parts of Changchun (P-City)	Dehui Prefecture	established	
1982-08-02	↳ Dehui County	↳ Dehui County	transferred	
1982-08-02	↳ Nong'an County	↳ Nong'an County	transferred	
1982-08-02	↳ Yushu County	↳ Yushu County	transferred	
1982-08-02	↳ Jiutai County	↳ Jiutai County	transferred	
1982-08-02	↳ Shuangyang County	↳ Shuangyang County	transferred	
1982-08-02	parts of Jilin (P-City)	Yongji Prefecture	established	
1982-08-02	↳ Yongji County	↳ Yongji County	transferred	
1982-08-02	↳ Shulan County	↳ Shulan County	transferred	
1982-08-02	↳ Jiaohe County	↳ Jiaohe County	transferred	
1982-08-02	↳ Huadian County	↳ Huadian County	transferred	
1982-08-02	↳ Panshi County	↳ Panshi County	transferred	
1983-01-18	all Province-controlled city (P-City) → Prefecture-level city (PL-City)			Civil Affairs Announcement
1983-01-18	all Prefecture-controlled city (PC-City) → County-level city (CL-City)			Civil Affairs Announcement
1983-03-24	Yanji County	Longjing County	renamed	
1983-08-30	Siping Prefecture	Siping (PL-City) city district	reorganized	
1983-08-30	↳ Siping (CL-City)	Siping (PL-City) city district	disestablished	
1983-08-30	parts of Siping Prefecture	provincial-controlled	transferred	
1983-08-30	↳ Liaoyuan (CL-City)	↳ ★ Liaoyuan (CL-City)	transferred	
1983-08-30	↳ Dongfeng County	↳ ☆ Dongfeng County	transferred	
1983-08-30	Dehui Prefecture	Changchun (P-City)	transferred	
1983-08-30	Yongji Prefecture	Jilin (P-City)	transferred	
1983-10-08	provincial-controlled	Liaoyuan (P-City) city district	established	
1983-10-08	↳ ★ Liaoyuan (CL-City)	Liaoyuan (P-City) city district	transferred	
1983-10-08	↳ ★ Liaoyuan (CL-City)	↳ Dongliao County	established	
1983-10-08	↳ ☆ Dongfeng County	↳ Dongfeng County	transferred	
1983-12-22	Siping (PL-City) city district	Tiexi District	established	
1983-12-22	Siping (PL-City) city district	Tiedong District	established	
1983-12-22	Liaoyuan (PL-City) city district	Longshan District	established	
1983-12-22	Liaoyuan (PL-City) city district	Xi'an District	established	
1985-02-04	Tonghua Prefecture	Tonghua (PL-City) city district	reorganized	
1985-02-04	Tonghua (CL-City)	Tonghua (PL-City) city district	disestablished	
1985-02-04	parts of Tonghua Prefecture	Hunjiang (PL-City) city district	established	
1985-02-04	Hunjiang (CL-City)	Hunjiang (PL-City) city district	disestablished	
1985-02-04	↳ Fusong County	↳ Fusong County	transferred	
1985-02-04	↳ Jingyu County	↳ Jingyu County	transferred	
1985-02-04	↳ Changbai County (Aut.)	↳ Changbai County (Aut.)	transferred	
1985-02-04	parts of Tonghua Prefecture	Meihekou (PL-City) city district	established	
1985-02-04	Hailong County	Meihekou (PL-City) city district	disestablished	
1985-02-04	↳ Huinan County	↳ Huinan County	transferred	
1985-02-04	↳ Liuhe County	↳ Liuhe County	transferred	
1985-02-04	parts of Siping (PL-City)	Gongzhuling (PL-City) city district	established	
1985-02-04	Huaide County	Gongzhuling (PL-City) city district	disestablished	
1985-02-04	↳ Yitong County	↳ Yitong County	transferred	
1985-02-28	Dunhua County	Dunhua (CL-City)	reorganized	
1985-08-30	Gongzhuling (PL-City) city district	Hailong District	established	
1985-08-30	Gongzhuling (PL-City) city district	Meihe District	established	
1985-12-19	Meihekou (PL-City) city district	Tonghua (PL-City)	merged into	
1985-12-19	Meihekou (PL-City) city district	↳ Meihekou (CL-City)	reorganized	
1985-12-19	↳ Huinan County	↳ Huinan County	transferred	
1985-12-19	↳ Liuhe County	↳ Liuhe County	transferred	
1985-12-19	Gongzhuling (PL-City)	Siping (PL-City)	merged into	
1985-12-19	↳ Hailong District	↳ Gongzhuling (CL-City)	established	
1985-12-19	↳ Meihe District	↳ Gongzhuling (CL-City)	established	
1985-12-19	↳ Yitong County	↳ Yitong County	transferred	
1986-09-08	Tonghua (PL-City) city district	Dongchang District	established	
1986-09-08	Tonghua (PL-City) city district	Erdaojiang District	established	
1986-09-08	Hunjiang (PL-City) city district	Badaojiang District	established	
1986-09-08	Hunjiang (PL-City) city district	Linjiang District	established	
1986-09-08	Hunjiang (PL-City) city district	Sanchahe District	established	
1987-05-21	Tao'an County	Taonan (CL-City)	reorganized	
1987-10-07	Fuyu County	Fuyu (CL-City)	reorganized	
1988-03-16	Ji'an County	Ji'an (CL-City)	reorganized	
1988-05-25	Hunchun County	Hunchun (CL-City)	reorganized	
1988-05-25	Longjing County	Longjing (CL-City)	reorganized	
1988-05-25	Huadian County	Huadian (CL-City)	reorganized	
1988-08-30	Da'an County	Da'an (CL-City)	reorganized	
1988-08-30	Yitong County	Yitong County (Aut.)	reorganized	
1988-08-30	Jiutai County	Jiutai (CL-City)	reorganized	
1989-08-15	Jiaohe County	Jiaohe (CL-City)	reorganized	
1990-12-26	Yushu County	Yushu (CL-City)	reorganized	
1992-02-10	Jiao District, Jilin	Fengman District	disestablished & established	Civil Affairs [1992]14
1992-06-06	parts of Baicheng Prefecture	Songyuan (PL-City)	established	State Council [1992]60
1992-06-06	↳ Fuyu (CL-City)	↳ Fuyu District	transferred & reorganized	State Council [1992]60
1992-06-06	↳ Qian Gorlos County (Aut.)	↳ Qian Gorlos County (Aut.)	transferred	State Council [1992]60
1992-06-06	↳ Changling County	↳ Changling County	transferred	State Council [1992]60
1992-09-01	Linjiang District	Linjiang County	reorganized	Civil Affairs [1992]95
1992-10-08	Shulan County	Shulan (CL-City)	reorganized	Civil Affairs [1992]113
1993-07-05	Helong County	Helong (CL-City)	reorganized	
1993-06-14	Baicheng Prefecture	Baicheng (PL-City)	reorganized	
1993-06-14	Baicheng (CL-City)	Taobei District	reorganized	
1993-11-28	Linjiang County	Linjiang (CL-City)	reorganized	Civil Affairs [1993]237
1994-01-31	Hunjiang (PL-City)	Baishan (PL-City)	renamed	State Council [1994]8
1994-07-06	Dehui County	Dehui (CL-City)	reorganized	Civil Affairs [1994]97
1995-07-06	Jiao District, Changchun	Luyuan District	disestablished & established	State Council [1995]65
1995-07-06	Erdaohezi District	Erdao District	renamed	State Council [1995]65
1995-07-06	Shuangyang County	Shuangyang District	reorganized	State Council [1995]65
1995-07-20	Fuyu District	Ningjiang District	renamed	State Council [1995]68
1995-07-20	parts of Fuyu District	Fuyu County	established	State Council [1995]68
1995-08-30	Panshi County	Panshi (CL-City)	reorganized	Civil Affairs [1995]57
1995-12-30	Sanchazi District	Jiangyuan County	reorganized	Civil Affairs [1995]87
1996-04-29	Shuangliao County	Shuangliao (CL-City)	reorganized	Civil Affairs [1996]32
2006-04-27	Jiangyuan County	Jiangyuan District	reorganized	State Council [2006]44
2010-02-23	Badaojiang District	Hunjiang District	renamed	State Council [2010]40
2013-01-24	Fuyu County	Fuyu (CL-City)	reorganized	State Council [2013]28
2014-10-20	Jiutai (CL-City)	Jiutai District	reorganized	State Council [2014]142
2020-06-??	parts of Siping (PL-City)	Changchun (PL-City)	transferred	
2020-06-??	↳ Gongzhuling (CL-City)	↳ Gongzhuling (CL-City)	transferred	

== Population composition ==
=== Prefectures ===
Prefecture	2010	2000
Changchun	7,677,089	7,135,439
Baicheng	2,033,058	2,025,891
Baishan	1,296,575	1,312,362
Jilin	4,414,681	4,485,494
Liaoyuan	1,176,645	1,267,033
Siping	3,386,325	3,292,326
Songyuan	2,880,086	
Tonghua	2,325,242	2,307,964
Yanbian	2,271,600	2,209,646

=== Counties ===
Name	Prefecture	2010
Nanguan	Changchun	1,012,547
Kuancheng	Changchun	457,959
Chaoyang	Changchun	846,688
Erdao	Changchun	402,090
Luyuan	Changchun	810,831
Shuangyang	Changchun	377,933
Jiutai	Changchun	738,606
Nong'an	Changchun	102,968
Yushu	Changchun	1,060,969
Dehui	Changchun	839,786
Changyi	Jilin	659,188
Longtan	Jilin	527,532
Chuanying	Jilin	492,159
Fengman	Jilin	296,924
Yongji	Jilin	394,622
Jiaohe	Jilin	447,380
Huadian	Jilin	444,997
Shulan	Jilin	645,925
Panshi	Jilin	505,954
Tiexi	Siping	278,837
Tiedong	Siping	335,000
Lishu	Siping	782,900
Yitong	Siping	475,409
Gongzhuling	Changchun	1,093,314
Shuangliao	Siping	420,865
Longshan	Liaoyuan	294,380
Xi'an	Liaoyuan	178,039
Dongfeng	Liaoyuan	355,201
Dongliao	Liaoyuan	349,025
Dongchang	Tonghua	360,195
Erdaojiang	Tonghua	146,682
Tonghua	Tonghua	247,225
Huinan	Tonghua	359,453
Liuhe	Tonghua	363,962
Meihekou	Tonghua	615,367
Ji'an	Tonghua	232,358
Badaojiang → Hunjiang	Baishan	364,849
Jiangyuan	Baishan	254,381
Fusong	Baishan	298,063
Jingyu	Baishan	131,677
Changbai	Baishan	72,575
Linjiang	Baishan	175,030
Ningjiang	Songyuan	612,816
Changling	Songyuan	639,205
Qian'an	Songyuan	301,438
Qian Gorlos	Songyuan	607,640
Fuyu	Songyuan	718,987
Taobei	Baicheng	517,613
Zhenlai	Baicheng	298,404
Tongyu	Baicheng	353,604
Taonan	Baicheng	432,271
Da'an	Baicheng	431,166
Yanji	Yanbian	563,154
Tumen	Yanbian	134,498
Dunhua	Yanbian	483,631
Hunchun	Yanbian	241,861
Longjing	Yanbian	177,295
Helong	Yanbian	189,597
Wangqing	Yanbian	255,499
Antu	Yanbian	226,065
