= Xining (disambiguation) =

Xining is the capital city of Qinghai province, China.

Xining may also refer to:

- Xining (1068–1077), a reign period by Emperor Shenzong of Song

== Other places in China ==
- Xining, Leibo County, Sichuan
- Xining Subdistrict, Liaoyuan, Jilin
- Xining Subdistrict, Suining, Sichuan
- Xining Subdistrict, Xuanwei, Yunnan

== See also ==
- Dongning (disambiguation)
- Sining
