= COVID-19 pandemic in Jilin =

- Disease: COVID-19
- Pathogen: SARS-CoV-2
- Location: Jilin, China
- First outbreak: Wuhan, Hubei
- Arrival date: 2020
- Confirmed cases: 40,297
- Recovered: 39,908
- Deaths: 5

The COVID-19 pandemic reached the province of Jilin, China in 2020.

== Statistics ==
=== 2020 ===
Division	Active	Confirmed	Deceased	Recovered
Jilin		40,297	5	39,908
Changchun				
Jilin City				
Tonghua				
Siping, Jilin	249			
Liaoyuan				
Baishan				
Baicheng				
Songyuan				
Yanbian				
Meihekou				
Gongzhuling				
Changbai Shan				

On February 24, the spokesperson of the Yanbian County Government stated that it would strengthen the joint prevention and control of customs, disease control, and public security inspections at the airport. Arrivals from South Korea would be separated and detained by county and city. Scenic spots in Yanbian Prefecture were temporarily closed, and travel agencies stopped accepting or organizing groups.

On May 9, in response to a new domestic primary case in Shulan City, the pandemic grade in Shulan City was raised from low to medium; the next day, due to 11 new confirmed cases in Shulan City, the risk level of Lanzhou City was raised again, from medium to high. Shulan City adopted strict control measures. Some local railway trains were suspended; all bus routes suspended service; and taxis were not allowed to operate across regions. Various communities and villages were closed and all people were screening in the city, focusing on those returning to Shulan from key domestic areas and overseas, and at the same time stopping all gatherings and closing all public services and entertainment venues. In principle, catering units were prohibited from dine-in; takeaway services could be provided.

Students in the third grade would switch to online teaching. At Jilin Provincial Epidemic Prevention and Control Video Conference, Bayin Chaolu, Secretary of the Jilin Provincial Party Committee and Leader of the Provincial Epidemic Prevention and Control Leading Group, said that it is necessary to learn from the lessons of the epidemic in Shulan City, quickly take strict and effective measures, stabilize the situation, and prevent the spread of the pandemic.

The steering group of the National Health and Medical Commission and the China Center for Disease Control and Prevention arrived in Jilin City and Shulan City on the same day to supervise prevention activities and take control; before May 8, the vice governor of Jilin Province, An Lijia, the executive deputy head of the Provincial Leading Group for Epidemic Prevention and Control, led officials in charge of health, public security, and disease control to Shulan City as soon as possible to supervise the epidemic prevention and control work.

On May 12, Jiaohe City issued a notice that all those who participated in a local wedding were required to be quarantined due to the confirmed diagnosis of the wedding photographer.

From May 19, urban bus passenger transport service in Jiaohe City was suspended.

On May 21, barber shops, nail salons, beauty salons, bathing pools, foot baths (pediatric shops), and other places where people gather in Jilin City were closed.

On May 22, the Jilin City Epidemic Prevention and Control Work Leading Group decided to prohibit residents of Jilin City from entering Beijing until the epidemic risk level went down.

On May 23, the Office of the Leading Group for the Prevention and Control of Novel Coronavirus Pneumonia in Jilin Province issued a notice to crack down on serious violations of the control measures.

On June 7, all road checkpoints in the urban area of Jilin City were cancelled and expressway checkpoints resumed normal traffic. At the same time, communities with no confirmed cases or those with confirmed cases that had been closed for more than 28 days were allowed to reopen; communities with confirmed cases that had been closed for less than 28 days remained closed. Residents could travel with a pass, and implemented temperature measurement and code scanning until the 28th day.

At 5 o'clock on June 8, Jilin Station resumed the operation of some trains.

As of July 27, Jilin Province had had no new imported confirmed cases for 86 consecutive days. The province had reported a total of 19 confirmed cases imported from abroad, and a total of 19 cases had been cured and discharged. On July 26, 2 newly imported confirmed cases appeared in Dalian (2 cases in Siping City) across the province, all of whom were asymptomatic infections imported from Dalian and notified by Jilin Province on July 25.

=== 2021 ===
On January 16, many areas were made medium-risk areas. Health care centers in Changchun and Tonghua organized training and teaching activities to sell products. Liu Shunchang, deputy director of the Jilin Provincial Department of Market Supervision, said that the relevant departments of the two places had launched a joint investigation, and severe penalties would be imposed for any violations of laws and regulations. On the same day, the Fuyu Municipal Commission for Discipline Inspection reported that nine officials were punished for violating work discipline during the epidemic prevention period, including for dereliction of duty and poor leadership. Starting from the 18th, residents of Gongzhuling City were to undergo free nucleic acid sampling and testing. All communities, family homes, and rural residents in Gongzhuling City were isolated at home and strictly prohibited from leaving the house. Daily necessities were purchased by specified personnel.

On January 21, Building 7 of Xinnong Community in Songyuan Economic and Technological Development Zone was adjusted to a medium-risk area.

On January 23, Tonghua City announced that 14 party members and cadres, including the director of the Municipal Health and Health Commission, the director of the Municipal Center for Disease Control and Prevention, and the deputy director of the Municipal Transportation Bureau, were held accountable for failing to monitor imported cases and failing to perform other duties. Many people were punished and dismissed from the party.

On January 25, the Changchun Municipal Commission for Discipline Inspection and Supervision held accountable eight party members and cadres who failed to perform their duties, neglected supervision, and neglected duties in the prevention and control of the epidemic in Gongzhuling City.

In mid-February, the CDCP published a paper in its official English journal, disclosing the details of the epidemic. During promotional activities, at least 141 related cases of infection were uncovered. According to the paper, despite muscle pain and other symptoms, Lin went to a pharmacy to buy medicine and then gave three lectures on two consecutive days. The doors and windows of the venue where the lecture was closed, and Lin did not wear a mask. The majority of those who attended the lectures were elderly, with a median age of 72. According to earlier reports, the lecture was touted as offering a gift of eggs, which attracted many elders. The lectures were lengthy and took place in a small, confined space. Participants lacked personal protection equipment (PPE) and did not maintain social distancing.

On February 20, many communities were assessed as low-risk areas; Dongchang District had no new confirmed cases for 14 consecutive days, and the whole area had been judged low-risk simultaneously. At the time, no medium or high risk areas existed in Jilin Province.

=== 2022 ===
On March 2, Keying International Trading Co., Ltd. in the coastal sub-district cooperation zone of Hunchun City was designated as a medium-risk area, and many places were designated as closed or controlled areas.

From March 4, all enclosed spaces in Yanji City were closed, off-campus training institutions suspended offline education, daycare institutions suspended offline services, religious places suspended services and collective religious activities, and activity venues suspended entertainment, singing and dancing, and performances. Welfare homes, nursing homes, prisons, and mental health institutions were all locked down.

On March 10, Zhang Lifeng, Secretary of the Party Committee of Jilin Institute of Agricultural Science and Technology, which had clustered infections, was dismissed due to poor epidemic prevention work. The Jilin Provincial Committee of the Chinese Communist Party (CCP) decided that Yue Qiang, the chief inspector of the Jilin Provincial People's Government and a member of the party group of the Provincial Department of Education, would concurrently serve as party secretary of Jilin Agricultural Science and Technology College.

On March 11, Changchun City Epidemic Prevention and Control Headquarters announced that starting immediately, three rounds of nucleic acid testing for all employees would be launched within Changchun City with the implementation of closed management.

On March 14, Jilin Province banned the movement of people across provinces, cities, and prefectures.

On March 19, the Jilin Provincial Committee of the CCP made Lu Qinglong Secretary of the Changyi District Committee of Jilin City and removed Liu Gefeng from the post; Liu Huijun became the Secretary of the Chuanying District Committee.

On April 28, the Office of the Leading Group for the Prevention and Control of New Coronavirus Pneumonia in Changchun City issued a notice: after research by the Leading Group for Epidemic Prevention and Control in Changchun City, on April 28 (April 29 for Kuancheng District), would gradually restore the normal order of production and life in Changchun City, and take the following measures:

- Personnel returning to work, production, business, and markets, and returning to work in the prevention area of the main urban area (including "epidemic-free areas") should travel as required. For other residents, only one person per household was allowed to travel each day, and should not leave the main urban area unless necessary. Residents of county-level prevention areas (including "epidemic-free communities") were allowed to move within the county, and should not leave the local area unless necessary. The community would strictly implement "one door to enter and exit", 24 hours a day. Outsiders were strictly prohibited from entering absent special circumstances.
- Party and government agencies, enterprises, and institutions were to implement the "two points and one line" commuting mode except for closed/controlled areas. Employees in closed/controlled areas that meet the conditions for resuming work and production can only go out but not enter; the company must continue to implement closed management; the prevention area should be fully released; and "point-to-point" commuting should be adopted. Enterprises resuming business should strictly implement the detection system of "early antigen and late nucleic acid" for employees. Enterprises resuming business must strictly implement temperature measurement by scanning codes, wearing masks, limiting traffic and distance, and controlling gatherings.
- Small supermarkets, barber shops, laundromats, auto repair shops, maternity and baby product stores, and other service industries in the prevention zone that are closely related to people's lives were allowed to resume business by strictly implementing epidemic prevention and control measures. Dine-in service of catering units was suspended, and services were provided by ordering online, picking up and delivery.
- Entertainment and leisure outlets such as Internet cafes, bars, KTV, dance halls, electronic game (game) halls, swimming pools, bathing pools, foot therapy shops, billiard halls, chess and card rooms, beauty treatment, physiotherapy, massage, fitness centers, gymnasiums, lottery stations, etc., remained closed. Gathering business places, libraries, museums, cultural centers (stations), theaters, and other cultural activity places remained closed. Scenic spots and rural tourism units remained closed.
- Rail transit did not operate, although 175 bus lines resumed operation. Passengers scan a QR code to board the bus, and strictly enforce mask wearing, boarding while maintaining distance, and limited traffic. Key epidemic prevention groups and "red and yellow code" personnel were prohibited from taking public transportation.
- Schools were allowed to reopen only after passing an individual assessment.
- The general public must practice personal protection, not gather, wash hands frequently, ventilate frequently, share meals, use serving chopsticks, and two-meter noodles. Weddings were postponed, funerals made brief, and banquets banned.
- Large-scale conferences, forums, performances, and other gathering activities were banned.
- Scofflaws were to be punished in accordance with relevant laws and regulations.

In May, a citizen of Siping City, Jilin Province, missed the 25th round of nucleic acid testing on May 19. Although he had retested on May 20, he was required to pay the cost of the previous 24 nucleic acid tests. The local government stated that it was an "attitude problem" for the citizen to miss the test. As of May 16, Siping City had reprimanded 390 people who did not participate in the nucleic acid test and charged 470 people for supplementary testing.

From June 20 to 22, Jilin City carried out all-area nucleic acid testing in the urban area over three consecutive days.

On September 6, during the epidemic period, Changchun City and relevant departments and units failed to implement the "quartet responsibilities" for epidemic prevention and control, and committed dereliction of duty in terms of nosocomial infection prevention and control, nucleic acid testing, and closed-loop management with varying degrees of treatment.

Starting from November 14, Yanji City stopped nucleic acid testing for all employees.
