= Gongnong Township, Jilin =

Gongnong Township 工农乡
- Township
- Location in Jilin
- Coordinates: 42°53′2″N 125°9′30″E
- Country: People's Republic of China
- Province: Jilin
- Prefecture-level city: Liaoyuan
- District: Longshan District
- Time zone: UTC+8 (China Standard)

Gongnong Township (simplified Chinese: 工农乡; traditional Chinese: 工农鄉; pinyin: Gōngnóng Xiāng) is a township under the administration of Longshan District, Liaoyuan, Jilin, China. As of 2018, it has 7 villages under its administration.
