= Jiashan (disambiguation) =

Jiashan may refer to the following locations in China:

- Jiashan County (嘉善县), Zhejiang
- Jiashan Township, Anhui (佳山乡), in Yushan District, Ma'anshan
- Jiashan Township, Hunan (槚山乡), in You County
- Jiashan Township, Jilin (甲山乡), in Dongliao County
