= Qian'an =

Qian'an may refer to the following locations in China:

- Qian'an, Hebei (迁安市), county-level city of Tangshan
  - Qian'an Town, Hebei (迁安镇)
- Qian'an County (乾安县), Songyuan, Jilin
  - Qian'an, Jilin (乾安镇)
