= Tiedong District =

Tiedong District may refer to:

- Tiedong District, Anshan, in Liaoning, China
- Tiedong District, Siping, in Jilin, China
