= Xinzhan =

Xinzhan may refer to:

- Xinzhan, Jiaohe, a town in Jiaohe, Jilin, China
- Xinzhan, Heilongjiang, a town in Zhaoyuan, Heilongjiang, China
- Xinzhan, Henan, a town in Huaiyang County, Henan, China
- Xinzhan, Guizhou, a town in Tongzi County, Guizhou, China
- Xinzhan Township, a township in Fuyu, Jilin, China
- Xinzhan Subdistrict, a subdistrict in Dongchang District, Tonghua, Jilin, China

== See also ==
- Xin Zhan: Red Cliff, a 2008 Mandarin EP by Alan Dawa Dolma
