= Jiangyuan =

Jiangyuan may refer to:

== Places in China ==
- Jiangyuan District (江源区), Baishan, Jilin
- Jiangyuan (江源镇), the name of a number of towns
  - Jiangyuan, Dunhua, Jilin
  - Jiangyuan, Chongzhou, Sichuan
  - Jiangyuan, Jianyang, Sichuan

== People ==
- Jiang Yuan, legendary ancestress of the dynastic rulers of the Zhou dynasty
