= List of county-level divisions of China =

County-level divisions are the third level of administration of the People's Republic of China and include counties, autonomous counties, banners, autonomous banners, county-level cities and districts. Most county-level divisions are administered as part of prefecture-level divisions, but some are administered directly by province-level divisions. Among the county-level divisions, this list also includes the Republic of China-controlled Taiwan Province and fractured Fujian Province.

The following lists show all county-level divisions in each province-level division.

== Provinces ==
=== East ===
- Anhui
- Fujian
- Jiangsu
- Jiangxi
- Shandong
- Zhejiang

=== Northwest ===
- Gansu
- Qinghai
- Shaanxi

=== Southwest ===
- Guizhou
- Sichuan
- Yunnan

=== Central ===
- Hubei
- Hunan
- Henan

=== South ===
- Guangdong
- Hainan

=== North ===
- Hebei
- Shanxi

=== Northeast ===
- Heilongjiang
- Jilin
- Liaoning

== Autonomous regions ==
- Guangxi
- Inner Mongolia
- Ningxia
- Tibet
- Xinjiang

== Municipalities ==
- Beijing
- Chongqing
- Shanghai
- Tianjin

== Special administrative regions ==
- Hong Kong
- Macau
