= Longshoushan =

Longshoushan is located in the centre of the prosperous areas in Liaoyuan, Jilin Province. Guilin from north to south, and to the beautiful dongliao river. Like a huge dragon, so named longshoushan. The number crunchers, green vegetation, is a famous scenic spot in Liaoyuan. There are many myths and legends about longshoushan. It become more mysterious and desirable. The environment It has natural and humanistic landscape. Longshan park is located in longshoushan. Both a comely longshan scenery for visitors to visit and have sika deer, peacock and other animals for visitors to see. It is a good place for the general public leisure tourism. The history Longshoushan, the first is called dagedashan, was later changed his name longshoushan, this is older people all know. It is said that there was a city on the mountain. But it was destroyed by war. There were three big temples that are fushou palace, baoan and mituo temple in early longshoushan.
