= Henan Subdistrict, Jiaohe =

Henan Subdistrict 河南街道
- Subdistrict
- Location in Jilin
- Coordinates: 43°43′55″N 127°19′41″E
- Country: People's Republic of China
- Province: Jilin
- Prefecture-level city: Jilin City
- County-level city: Jiaohe

Area
  - Total: 315.4 km^{2} (121.8 sq mi)

Population (2005)
  - Total: 31,171
  - Density: 98.83/km^{2} (256.0/sq mi)
- Time zone: UTC+8 (China Standard)

Henan Subdistrict (Chinese: 河南街道; pinyin: Hénán Jiēdào) is a subdistrict in Jiaohe, Jilin province, China. As of 2020, it has 26 villages under its administration. As of 2005, the subdistrict spans an area of 315.4 square kilometres (121.8 mi^{2}). The subdistrict had a population of 14,643 according to the 2000 Chinese Census, but has since undergone boundary changes, bringing its population up to 31,171 as of 2005.

== History ==
Chishui Township (Chinese: 池水乡), which would be merged into Henan Subdistrict in 2005, was established as a district in 1949, but would change to a township in 1956, to a people's commune in 1958, and then again to a township in 1983.

Henan Subdistrict was created from the town of Jiaohe (Chinese: 蛟河镇) in 1989.

In 2005, Henan Subdistrict transferred Tuanjie Village (Chinese: 团结村) and Xinli Village (Chinese: 新立村) to neighboring Hebei Subdistrict as part of its promotion from a township to a subdistrict. During this process, portions of Henan Subdistrict which were not initially portions of these two villages were merged into them, as part of the transfer. Furthermore, Henan Subdistrict transferred Xiaobajiazi Village (Chinese: 小八家子村) to neighboring Chang'an Subdistrict. In return, seven villages from neighboring Naizishan Subdistrict, including Anle Village (Chinese: 安乐村) and Xinli Village (Chinese: 新立村, not to be confused with the one transferred to Hebei Subdistrict), were incorporated into Henan Subdistrict. Henan Subdistrict also gained all as eight villages from the now-defunct Chishui Township, which was now merged into Henan Subidstrict. These transfers resulted in Henan Subdistrict administering 26 villages, comprising an area of 315.4 square kilometres (121.8 mi^{2}), and hosting a population of 31,171.

== Administrative divisions ==
The subdistrict has jurisdiction over the following 26 administrative villages:

- Xianfeng Village (Chinese: 先锋村)
- Xinmin Village (Chinese: 新民村)
- Xinsheng Village (Chinese: 新胜村)
- Yangmulinzi Village (Chinese: 杨木林子村)
- Xihuangdi Village (Chinese: 西荒地村)
- Xintun Village (Chinese: 新屯村)
- Donghuangdi Village (Chinese: 东荒地村)
- Zhishu Village (Chinese: 直属村)
- Dongxiaojiaohe Village (Chinese: 东小蛟河村)
- Nanxiaojiaohe Village (Chinese: 南小蛟河村)
- Dehegou Village (Chinese: 德河沟村)
- Huanghua Village (Chinese: 黄花村)
- Nandianzi Village (Chinese: 南甸子村)
- Wanbao Village (Chinese: 万宝村)
- Hongsheng Village (Chinese: 红胜村)
- Kouqin Village (Chinese: 口钦村)
- Xinli Village (Chinese: 新立村)
- Anle Village (Chinese: 安乐村)
- Chishui Village (Chinese: 池水村)
- Liushulinzi Village (Chinese: 柳树林子村)
- Nianzigou Village (Chinese: 碾子沟村)
- Dengchang Village (Chinese: 登场村)
- Baojia Village (Chinese: 保家村)
- Zhenxing Village (Chinese: 振兴村)
- Bashangde Village (Chinese: 八垧地村)
- Mangniuhe Village (Chinese: 牤牛河村)

== Transportation ==
National Highway 302 passes through Henan Subdistrict.

== See also ==
- List of township-level divisions of Jilin
