= Streptomyces tyrosinilyticus =

Scientific classification
- Domain: Bacteria
- Kingdom: Bacillati
- Phylum: Actinomycetota
- Class: Actinomycetia
- Order: Streptomycetales
- Family: Streptomycetaceae
- Genus: Streptomyces
- Species: S. tyrosinilyticus

Binomial name
- Streptomyces tyrosinilyticus Zhao et al. 2015

Species of bacterium

Streptomyces tyrosinilyticus is a bacterium species from the genus of Streptomyces which has been isolated from river sediments from the South River in Jiaohe in the Jilin Province in China.

== See also ==
- List of Streptomyces species
