= Xining Subdistrict, Liaoyuan =

Xining Subdistrict 西宁街道
- Subdistrict
- Location in Jilin
- Coordinates: 42°54′7″N 125°7′47″E
- Country: China
- Province: Jilin
- Prefecture-level city: Liaoyuan
- District: Longshan District
- Time zone: UTC+8 (China Standard Time)

Xining Subdistrict (Chinese: 西宁街道; pinyin: Xīníng Jiēdào) is a subdistrict situated in Longshan District, Liaoyuan, Jilin, China.

== See also ==
- List of township-level divisions of Jilin
