= Xinzhan, Jiaohe =

Xinzhan 新站镇
- Town
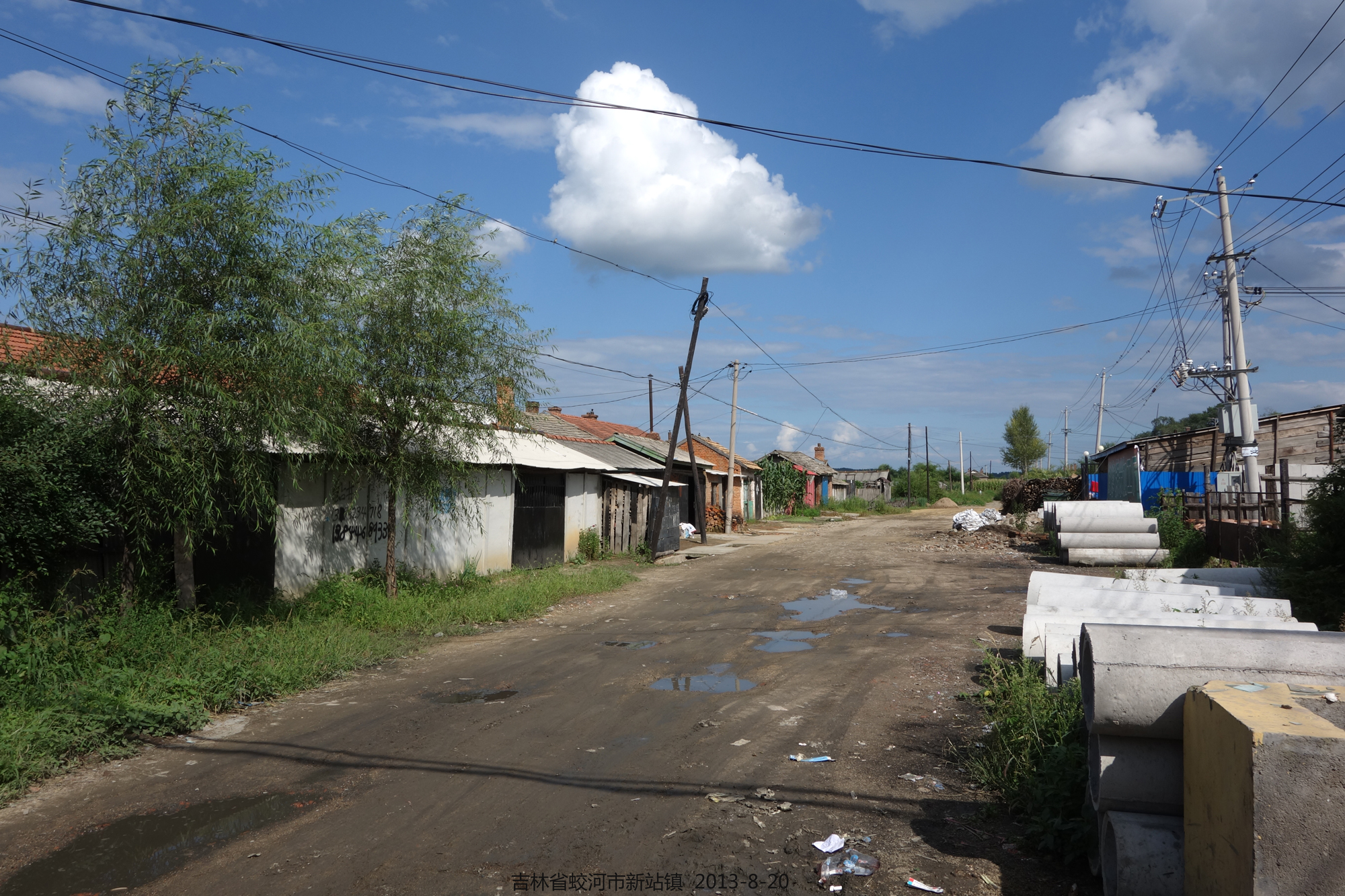

- Location within Jilin
- Coordinates: 43°52′N 127°20′E
- Country: China
- Province: Jilin
- County-level city: Jiaohe

Area
  - Total: 567.93 km^{2} (219.28 sq mi)

Population (2018)
  - Total: 33,787

Xinzhan, Jiaohe
- Traditional Chinese: 新站鎮
- Simplified Chinese: 新站镇
Transcriptions
Standard Mandarin
- Hanyu Pinyin: Xīnzhān zhèn
Wu
- Romanization: sin zae tsen
Yue: Cantonese
- Jyutping: san1 zaam6 zan3

Xinzhan (simplified Chinese: 新站镇; traditional Chinese: 新站鎮; pinyin: Xīnzhàn Zhèn) is a town in the county-level city of Jiaohe, Jilin, China. It is located in 17 kilometres (11 mi) north of Jiaohe's city center. To its north is the county-level city of Shulan, to its east is Qianjin, to its south is Lafa Subdistrict, and to its west is Tianggang. The town has an area of 567.93 square kilometres (219.28 sq mi), and a hukou population of 33,787 as of 2018.

Xinzhan is divided into 1 residential community and 31 administrative villages. The government organs are located in the eponymous Xinzhan Village (Chinese: 新站村), which spans an area of 3.7 square kilometres (1.4 sq mi).

== History ==
During the Qing Dynasty, a relay station named Lafa Relay Station (simplified Chinese: 拉法驿站; traditional Chinese: 拉法驛站) moved to the area, and was colloquially known as "Xinzhan" (lit. new station).

Part of the Lafa-Xinzhan battle was fought at Xinzhan during the Chinese Civil War. From June 8 through June 10, 1946, Kuomintang (KMT) forces fought Chinese Communist Party forces in Xinzhan during the conclusion of the battle. The battle ended in Xinzhan, and resulted in the defeat of KMT forces.

The area was organized as a bao (Chinese: 保) in 1933, and was re-organized as a street (Chinese: 街; pinyin: Jiē) in 1938, and as a town in 1954. Xinzhan was re-organized as a people's commune in 1958, and was reverted to a town in 1985. Longfeng Township (simplified Chinese: 龙凤乡; traditional Chinese: 龍鳳鄉) was merged into Xinzhan in 2001.

At 2018, two of the town's residential communities, Xinyi (Chinese: 新驿) and Xinyue (Chinese: 新跃) were merged as one, called Xinyu (Chinese: 新毓).

== Geography ==
The town is located in the Xinzhan basin, with Mount Dahuangdingzi (大荒頂子山) to the east, Mount Laoye (老爺嶺) to the northwest, and Mount Lafa (拉法山) to the south. The town's tallest mountain is Mount Xitu (西土山) with the altitude of 1189.3 m. The town is largely forested, and has three forest farms: Pingchuan (平川), Longfeng (龍鳳), Laoyeling (老爺嶺). The town is located in the Changbai Mountains.

Longfeng River flows in the town's east, Laoyeling River flows through the west, and Minzhu River (Chinese: 民主河) flows through the north. In the town's south, they converge, forming the Lafa River, which eventually flows into Songhua Lake.

== Demographics ==
As of 2018, Xinzhan has a hukou population of 33,787.

As of 2012, Xinzhan had a population of 44,569 people, among them has 20,311 people is citizens.

As of the 2000 Chinese Census, Xinzhan had a population of 39,629.

== Administrative divisions ==
Xinzhan has 1 residential community and 31 administrative villages.

- Communities: Xinyu (新毓)
- Villages: Shimenzi (石門子), Baoshan (寶山), Shuangwang (雙旺), Changyou (長友), Shuangdingzi (雙頂子), Jiliang (基良), Fu'an (富安), Longfeng (龍鳳), Lengfengkou (冷風口), Bao'an (保安), Kaoshan (靠山), Zhenzhu (珍珠), Pingyuan (平原), Fuxing (復興), Yangyu (養魚), Donggou (東溝), Chaoyang (朝陽), Liujiazi (六家子), Wujiazi (五家子), Jixiang (吉祥), Laoyeling (老爺嶺), Bei'an (北安), Xiaogujia (小姑家), Dali (大利), Wenhua (文化), Henan (河南), Aihe (艾河), Renhe (仁和), Xinzhan (新站), Shucai (蔬菜), Xinxian (新鮮)

== Transport ==
The Lafa–Harbin railway and Jilin Provincial Highway 204 both pass through the town. The Xinzhan railway station serves as a stop on the Lafa-Harbin railway.
