= Xi'an, Liaoyuan =

Xi'an 西安区
- District
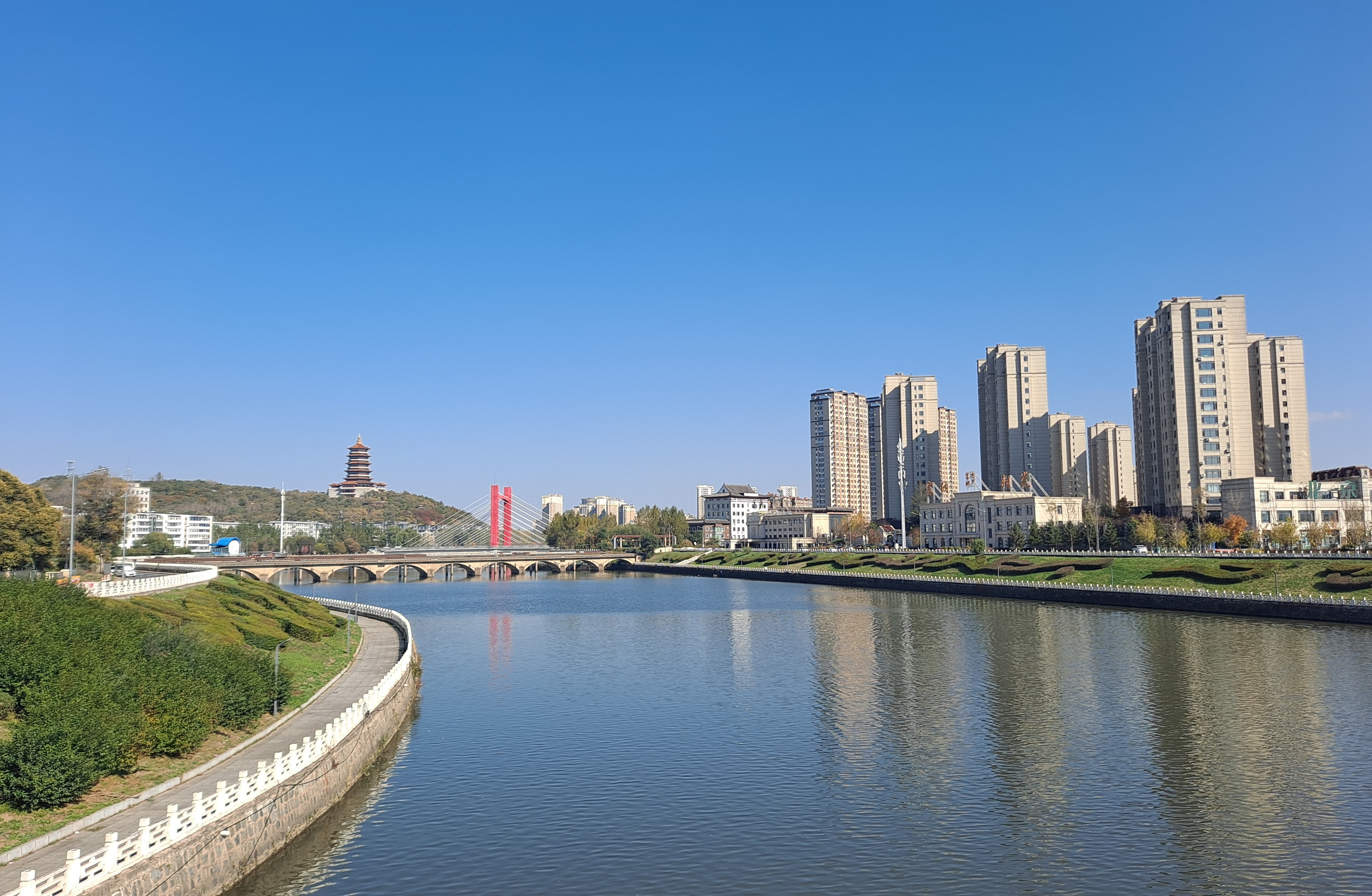

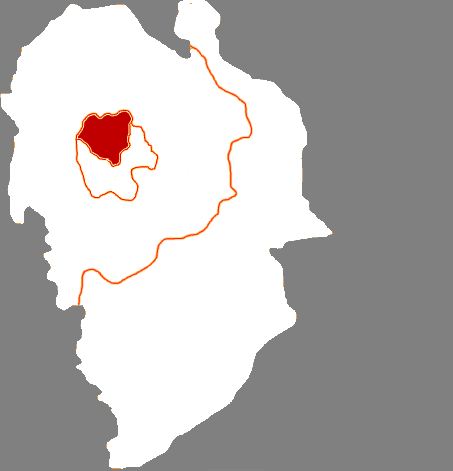
- Xi'an in Liaoyuan

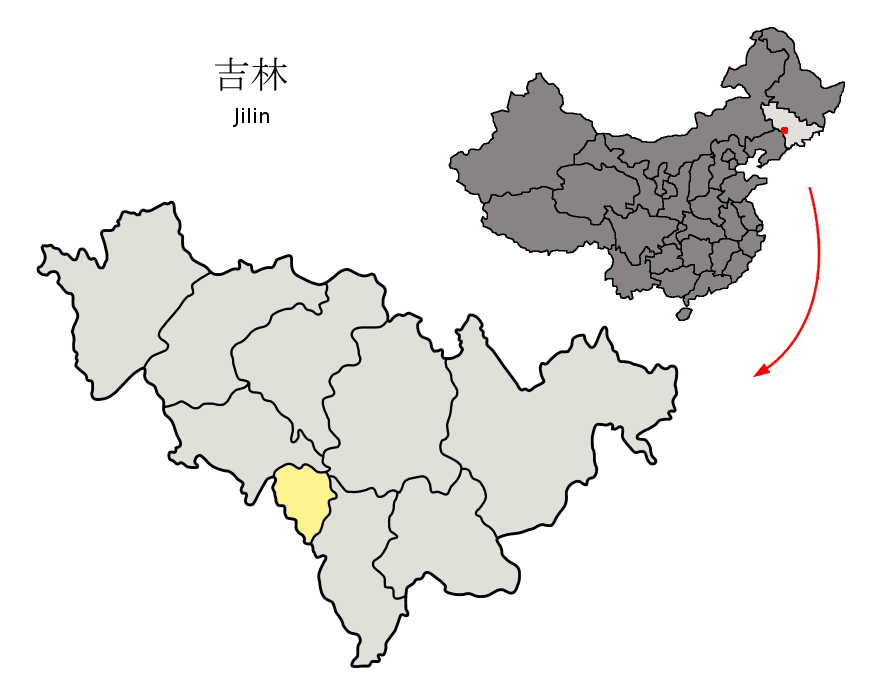
- Liaoyuan in Jilin

- Location within Jilin province
- Coordinates: 42°55′39″N 125°08′54″E
- Country: People's Republic of China
- Province: Jilin
- Prefecture-level city: Liaoyuan
- Time zone: UTC+8 (China Standard)

Xi'an District (simplified Chinese: 西安区; traditional Chinese: 西安區; pinyin: Xī'ān Qū), formerly Xi'an County, is a district of the city of Liaoyuan, Jilin Province, China.

== Administrative divisions ==
Subdistricts:

- Xiancheng Subdistrict (仙城街道), Dongshan Subdistrict (东山街道), Fuguo Subdistrict (富国街道), Xianfeng Subdistrict (先锋街道), Anjia Subdistrict (安家街道), Tai'an Subdistrict (太安街道)

The only township is Dengta Township (灯塔乡).

== See also ==
- Liaoyuan Miners' Mass Grave
