= Qian'an County =

Qian'an County 乾安县
- County
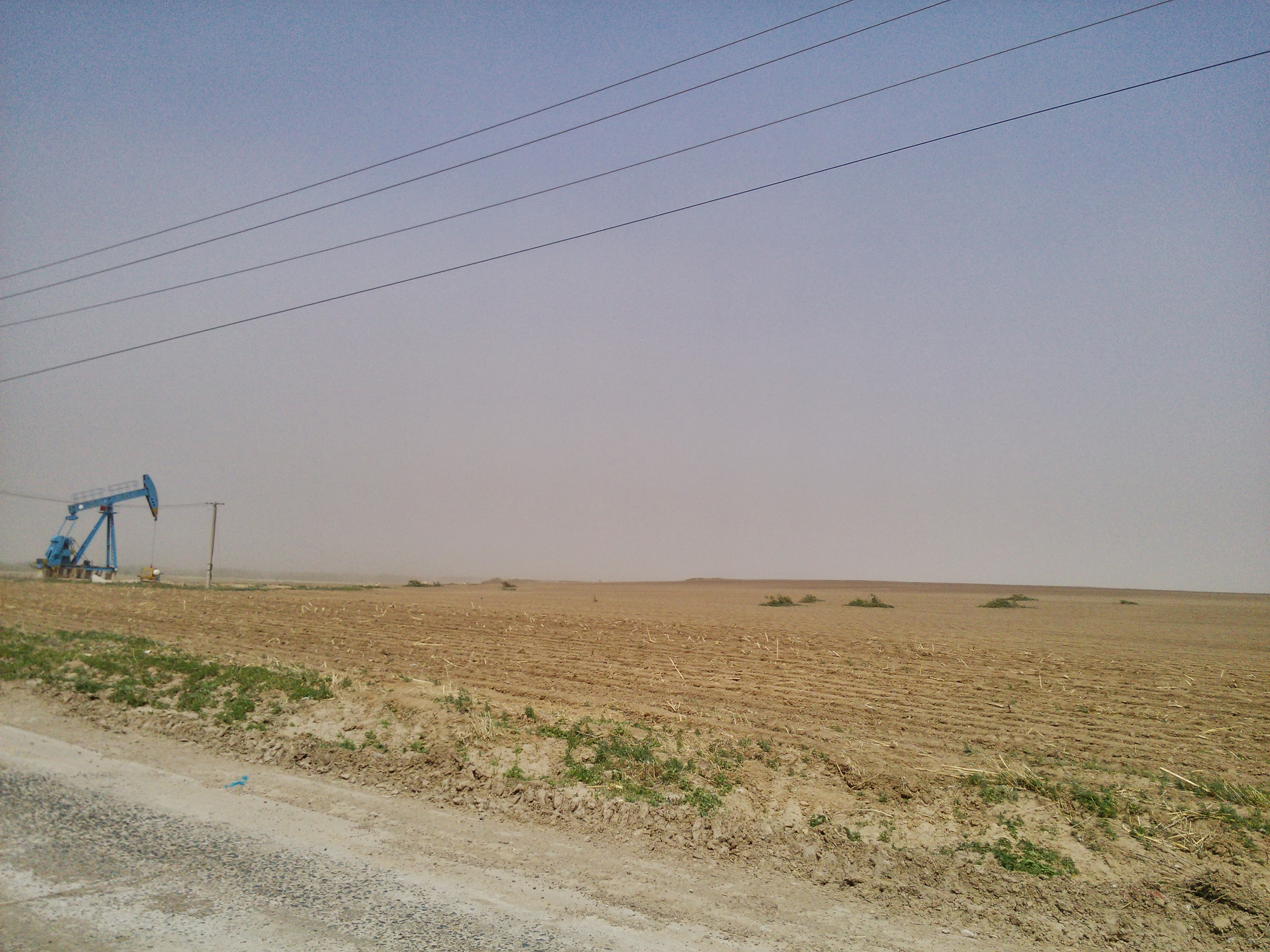

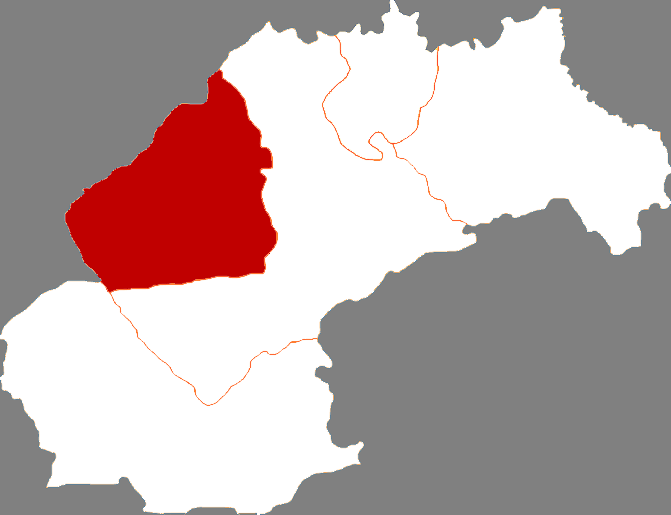
- Qian'an in Songyuan

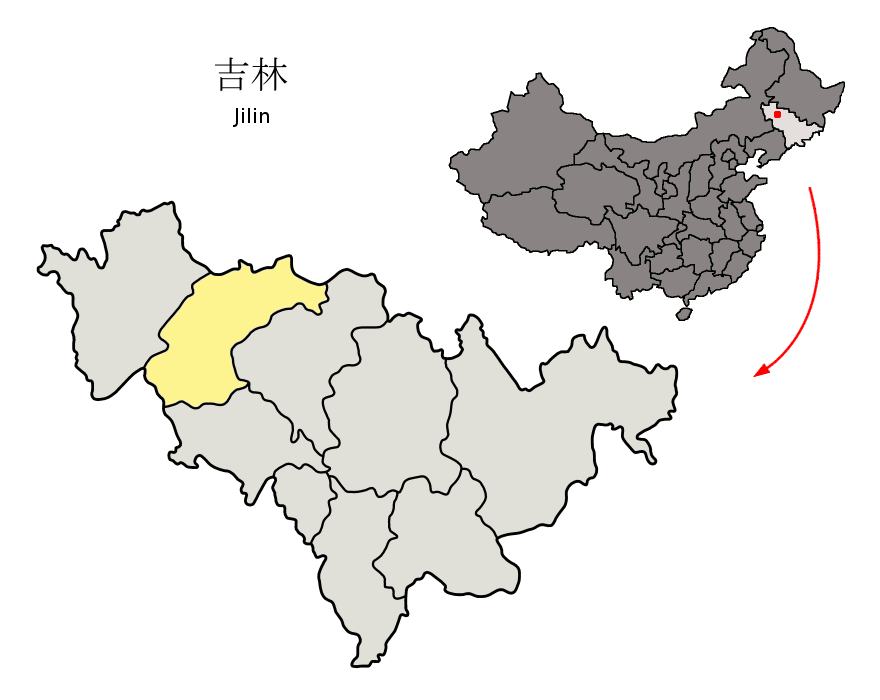
- Songyuan in Jilin
- Coordinates: 45°00′14″N 124°02′28″E
- Country: People's Republic of China
- Province: Jilin
- Prefecture-level city: Songyuan
- County seat: Qian'an Town (乾安县)

Area
  - Total: 3,522 km^{2} (1,360 sq mi)
- Elevation: 146 m (479 ft)

Population (2002)
  - Total: 300,000
  - Density: 85/km^{2} (220/sq mi)
- Time zone: UTC+8 (China Standard)

Qian'an County (simplified Chinese: 乾安县; traditional Chinese: 乾安縣; pinyin: Qián'ān Xiàn) is a county in the northwest of Jilin province, China. It is under the administration of the prefecture-level city of Songyuan, with a 2002 population of 300,000 and an area of 3,522 km^{2} (1,360 sq mi).

== Administrative divisions ==
There are six towns and four townships under the county's administration.

Towns:

- Qian'an (乾安镇)
- Dabusu (大布苏镇)
- Shuizi (水字镇)
- Suozi (所字镇)
- Anzi (安字镇)
- Rangzi (让字镇)

Townships:

- Yuzi Township (余字乡)
- Zanzi Township (赞字乡)
- Daozi Township (道字乡)
- Yanzi Township (严字乡)

== Climate ==
Climate data for Qian'an, elevation 146 m (479 ft), (1991–2020 normals, extremes 1981–2010)
Month	Jan	Feb	Mar	Apr	May	Jun	Jul	Aug	Sep	Oct	Nov	Dec	Year
Record high °C (°F)	3.1 (37.6)	14.5 (58.1)	22.0 (71.6)	31.4 (88.5)	36.5 (97.7)	39.3 (102.7)	38.4 (101.1)	37.1 (98.8)	33.0 (91.4)	28.5 (83.3)	19.0 (66.2)	10.0 (50.0)	39.3 (102.7)
Mean daily maximum °C (°F)	−9.8 (14.4)	−3.8 (25.2)	4.8 (40.6)	15.1 (59.2)	22.6 (72.7)	27.6 (81.7)	29.1 (84.4)	27.6 (81.7)	22.7 (72.9)	13.5 (56.3)	1.3 (34.3)	−8.1 (17.4)	11.9 (53.4)
Daily mean °C (°F)	−15.4 (4.3)	−10.1 (13.8)	−1.4 (29.5)	8.7 (47.7)	16.5 (61.7)	22.0 (71.6)	24.3 (75.7)	22.6 (72.7)	16.5 (61.7)	7.4 (45.3)	−4.0 (24.8)	−13.2 (8.2)	6.2 (43.1)
Mean daily minimum °C (°F)	−19.9 (−3.8)	−15.5 (4.1)	−7.0 (19.4)	2.5 (36.5)	10.5 (50.9)	16.7 (62.1)	19.9 (67.8)	18.0 (64.4)	11.0 (51.8)	2.4 (36.3)	−8.2 (17.2)	−17.3 (0.9)	1.1 (34.0)
Record low °C (°F)	−34.6 (−30.3)	−34.0 (−29.2)	−21.1 (−6.0)	−8.5 (16.7)	−0.4 (31.3)	4.7 (40.5)	11.3 (52.3)	9.1 (48.4)	0.2 (32.4)	−14.1 (6.6)	−23.5 (−10.3)	−31.5 (−24.7)	−34.6 (−30.3)
Average precipitation mm (inches)	1.6 (0.06)	2.0 (0.08)	5.5 (0.22)	11.9 (0.47)	43.4 (1.71)	72.0 (2.83)	121.6 (4.79)	98.5 (3.88)	37.1 (1.46)	18.4 (0.72)	6.6 (0.26)	3.6 (0.14)	422.2 (16.62)
Average precipitation days (≥ 0.1 mm)	2.7	1.8	3.6	3.8	8.0	11.2	12.1	9.5	6.7	4.5	3.5	3.6	71
Average snowy days	4.5	3.3	4.6	1.2	0.1	0	0	0	0	1.3	4.3	6.3	25.6
Average relative humidity (%)	64	55	48	43	48	60	73	73	63	57	60	66	59
Mean monthly sunshine hours	186.9	203.5	242.1	244.0	265.1	250.3	228.6	234.7	239.2	216.3	176.6	166.0	2,653.3
Percentage possible sunshine	65	69	65	60	57	54	49	54	65	65	62	61	61
Source: China Meteorological Administration
