= Tiexi, Siping =

Tiexi 铁西区
- District
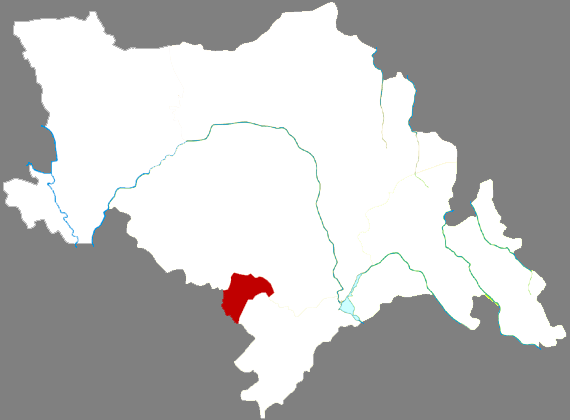
- Location in Tiexi
- Coordinates: 43°10′28″N 124°22′25″E
- Country: China
- Province: Jilin
- Prefecture-level city: Siping
- Seat: Renxing Subdistrict

Area
  - Total: 493.72 km^{2} (190.63 sq mi)
- Elevation: 179 m (587 ft)

Population (2020 census)
  - Total: 314,307
  - Density: 636.61/km^{2} (1,648.8/sq mi)
- Time zone: UTC+8 (China Standard)
- Website: txq.siping.gov.cn

Tiexi District (simplified Chinese: 铁西区; traditional Chinese: 鐵西區; pinyin: Tiěxī Qū; lit. 'west of the railroad') is a district of Siping City, Jilin, China.

== Administrative divisions ==
There are 5 subdistricts and 1 township.

- Renxing Subdistrict (仁兴街道)
- Yingxiong Subdistrict (英雄街道)
- Zhanqian Subdistrict (站前街道)
- Beigou Subdistrict (北沟街道)
- Dizhi Subdistrict (地直街道)
- Pingxi Township (平西乡)
