= Xining Subdistrict, Xuanwei =

Xining Subdistrict 西宁街道
- Subdistrict
- Location in Yunnan
- Coordinates: 26°14′9″N 104°5′34″E
- Country: China
- Province: Yunnan
- Prefecture-level city: Qujing
- County-level city: Xuanwei
- Time zone: UTC+8 (China Standard Time)

Xining Subdistrict (Chinese: 西宁街道; pinyin: Xīníng Jiēdào) is a subdistrict situated in Xuanwei, Yunnan, China. As of 2020, it administers the following five residential neighborhoods and five villages:

Neighborhoods

- Xiyuan (西苑)
- Jinxi (锦西)
- Laobu (老堡)
- Huajiao (花椒)
- Yuantun (袁屯)

Villages

- Majie Village (马街村)
- Jingwai Village (靖外村)
- Liezu Village (列租村)
- Qiapo Village (洽坡村)
- Chishui Village (赤水村)

== See also ==
- List of township-level divisions of Yunnan
