= Dongning =

Dongning may refer to:

- Dongning, Heilongjiang, a county-level city in Heilongjiang, China
- Kingdom of Tungning, Han Chinese government which ruled Taiwan, between 1661 and 1683
