= Hebei Subdistrict, Jiaohe =

Hebei Subdistrict 河北街道
- Subdistrict
- Location in Jilin
- Coordinates: 43°42′52″N 127°19′58″E
- Country: People's Republic of China
- Province: Jilin
- Prefecture-level city: Jilin City
- County-level city: Jiaohe
- Time zone: UTC+8 (China Standard)

Hebei Subdistrict (Chinese: 河北街道; pinyin: Héběi Jiēdào) is a subdistrict in Jiaohe, Jilin province, China. As of 2020, it has six residential communities and two villages under its administration:

- Yongxiang Community (永祥社区)
- Yongtai Community (永泰社区)
- Yongkang Community (永康社区)
- Yonglong Community (永隆社区)
- Fenglinwan Community (枫林湾社区)
- Yongsheng Community (永盛社区)
- Tuanjie Village (团结村)
- Xinli Village (新立村)

== See also ==
- List of township-level divisions of Jilin
