= Dongliao County =

Dongliao County 东辽县
- County
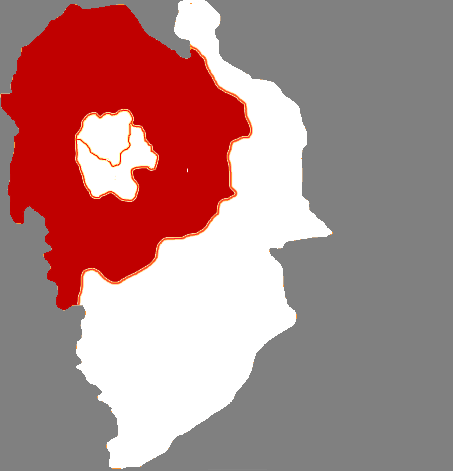
- Location of Dongliao county in Liaoyuan City, China

- Location within Jilin
- Coordinates: 42°56′N 124°59′E
- Country: People's Republic of China
- Province: Jilin
- Prefecture-level city: Liaoyuan
- County seat: Baiquan (白泉镇)
- Elevation: 272 m (892 ft)
- Time zone: UTC+8 (China Standard)

Dongliao County (simplified Chinese: 东辽县; traditional Chinese: 東遼縣; pinyin: Dōngliáo Xiàn) is a county of western Jilin province, Northeast China. It is under the administration of Liaoyuan City. County has its name because there is an origin of Dongliao River.

== Administrative Divisions ==
Towns: Baiquan (白泉镇), Liaoheyuan (辽河源镇), Weijin (渭津镇), Anshu (安恕镇), Pinggang (平岗镇), Quantai (泉太镇), Jian'an (建安镇), Anshi (安石镇), Yunshun (云顶镇).

Townships: Lingyun Township (凌云乡), Jiashan Township (甲山乡), Zumin Township (足民乡), Jinzhou Township (金州乡).
