= Lafa Subdistrict =

Subdistrict of Jiaohe, Jilin, China

Coordinates: 43°49′34.3″N 127°19′52″E

- Traditional Chinese: 拉法街道
- Simplified Chinese: 拉法街道
Transcriptions
Standard Mandarin
- Hanyu Pinyin: Lāfǎ jiēdào
Wu
- Romanization: 'la fah ka dau
Yue: Cantonese
- Jyutping: laa1 faat3 gaai1 dou6

Lafa (Manchu: ᠯᡝᡶᡠ, romanized: Lefu, lit. 'bear') is the subdistrict of Jiaohe, Jilin, China. It is located at the northeast of Jiaohe, away from Jiaohe city 12 km, below the Lafa Mountain. The east is Qianjin, the southeast is Wulin, the south is Jiaohe new town (Henan subdistrict), the west is Qingling, the north is Xinzhan. The area of Lafa is 327.35 km^{2}, among this has 57.6% is forest. The subdistrict has 18 administrate villages and 65 natural villages, and also has 1 administrate community with 3 neighborhoods. The government sent organs is located in Lafa village.

== History ==
The original name of Lafa was Lamenzi (砬門子), because the local terrain is high at east and west, low at central, looks like the big stone gate. Chinese name Lafa was transfer from Manchu name Lefu, which meaning bear. There had Lafa station at Qing dynasty, when at 1928, Jidun railway (吉敦鐵路) was set railway station here.

1938 set up Lafa village, 1959 set up Lafa people's commune, 1983 set up Lafa township, 1992 set up Lafa town. At 1997, two villages (Xinmin, Xianfeng) was given to Jiaohe city. 2006, Lafa was set up as subdistrict.

In the night of June 7, 1946, the army of KMT was fight with CCP, they were fighting for the Changtu railway. This is called Lafa-Xinzhan battle. The battle was ended at next day morning, and KMT was failed.

== Geography ==
The east and west of Lafa is mountain, the south is valley, looks like saddle. East-west longs 34 km, South-north longs 17 km. Temperate continental monsoon climate. Here is affected by the Songhua Lake, the average annual temperature is 3.6°C, the no frost day is 130 days, the precipitation is 700 – 750 mm.

Lafa has three rivers, they are used as irrigation. Among then, the Lafa river is across away, flow together into Jiao river at the south.

About the traffic, there has Lafa railway station with Labin, Changtu railway. And it has 302 state road., 204 provincial highway crossing here.

== Residents ==
Lafa has 22,000 people (2011), among then has 19947 people is farmer.

== Sub-divide ==
Lafa has one community and 18 villages.

- Community: Lafa (拉法)
- Village: Lafa (拉法), Xinxing (新興), Dadianzi (大甸子), Tianbao (田寶), Dapo (大坡), Haiqing (海青), Songjia (宋家), Yihe (義和), Aiguo (愛國), Shanzui (山咀), Yongxin (永新), Beida (北大), Changjia (常家), Gongan (公安), Xinxiang (新鄉), Shibashangdi (十八垧地), Ziqiang (自強), Xiangyang (向陽)
