= Xining Subdistrict, Suining =

Xining Subdistrict 西宁街道
- Subdistrict
- Location in Sichuan
- Coordinates: 30°29′30″N 105°33′59″E
- Country: China
- Province: Sichuan
- Prefecture-level city: Suining
- District: Chuanshan District
- Time zone: UTC+8 (China Standard Time)

Xining Subdistrict (Chinese: 西宁街道; pinyin: Xīníng Jiēdào) is a subdistrict situated in Chuanshan District, Suining, Sichuan, China. As of 2020, it administers the following four residential neighborhoods and four villages:

Neighborhoods

- Jingui Community (金桂社区)
- Wenxingqiao Community (文星桥社区)
- Qinggang Community (青岗社区)
- Wuliya Community (五里垭社区)

Villages

- Zhangshuyan Village (樟树堰村)
- Lanjing Village (兰井村)
- Fuguangmiao Village (福光庙村)
- Xujiayan Village (徐家堰村)

== See also ==
- List of township-level divisions of Sichuan
