= Longshan, Liaoyuan =

Longshan 龙山区
- District
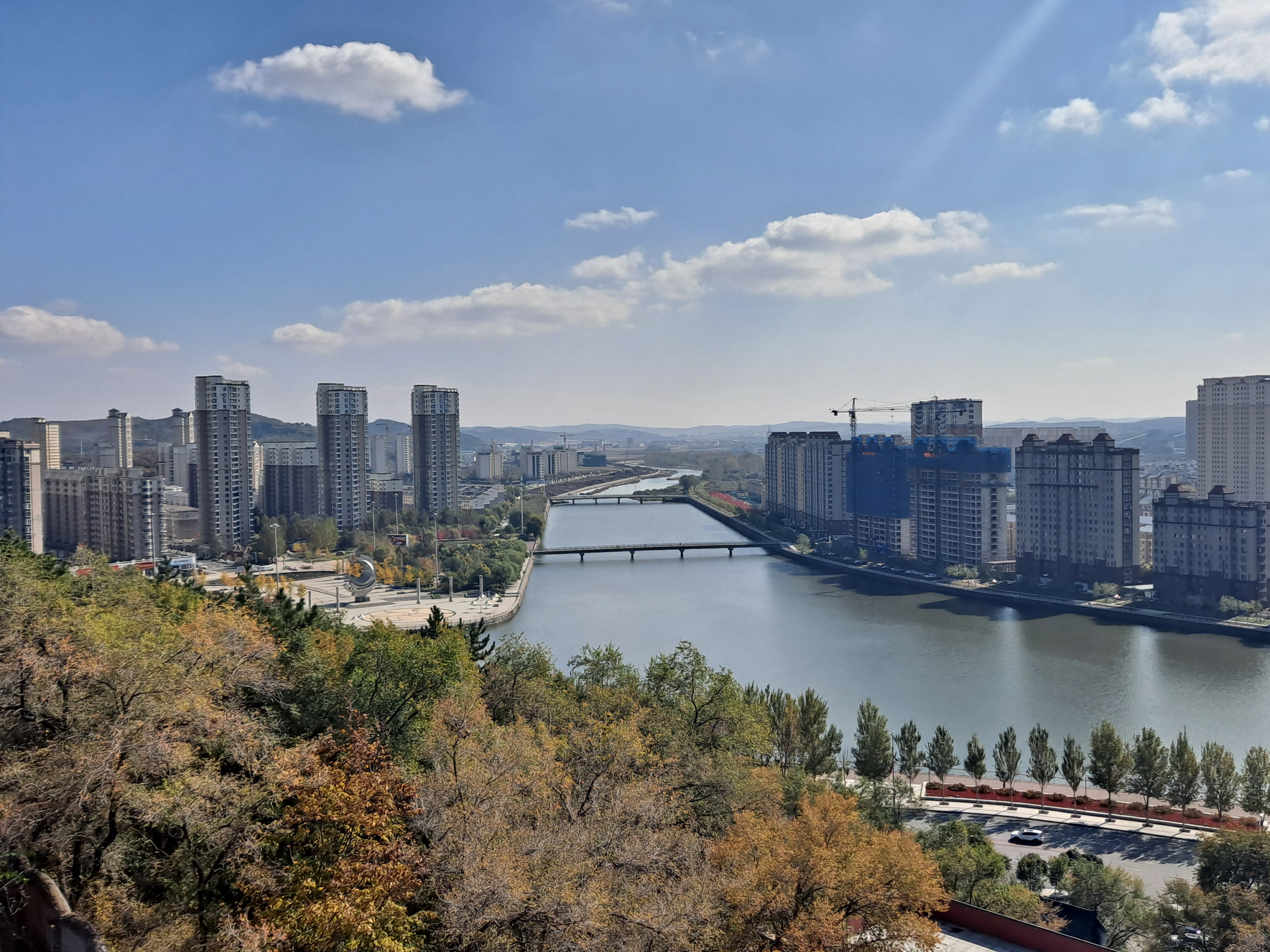

- Location within Jilin province
- Coordinates: 42°53′42″N 125°8′0″E
- Country: China
- Province: Jilin
- Prefecture-level city: Liaoyuan
- District seat: Xining Subdistrict

Area
  - Total: 236 km^{2} (91 sq mi)
- Elevation: 280 m (920 ft)

Population (2020 census)
  - Total: 327,079
  - Density: 1,390/km^{2} (3,590/sq mi)
- Time zone: UTC+8 (China Standard)
- Website: www.jllyls.gov.cn

Longshan District (simplified Chinese: 龙山区; traditional Chinese: 龍山區; pinyin: Lóngshān Qū; lit. 'Dragon Mountain') is a district of Liaoyuan, Jilin, China.

== Administrative divisions ==
There are 8 subdistricts, 1 town and 1 township.

- Dongji Subdistrict (东吉街道)
- Nankang Subdistrict (南康街道)
- Beishou Subdistrict (北寿街道)
- Xining Subdistrict (西宁街道)
- Zhanqian Subdistrict (站前街道)
- Xiangyang Subdistrict (向阳街道)
- Xinxing Subdistrict (新兴街道)
- Fuzhen Subdistrict (福镇街道),
- Shoushan Town (寿山镇)
- Gongnong Township (工农乡)
