= Jiaohe, Jilin =

Jiaohe 蛟河市
- County-level city
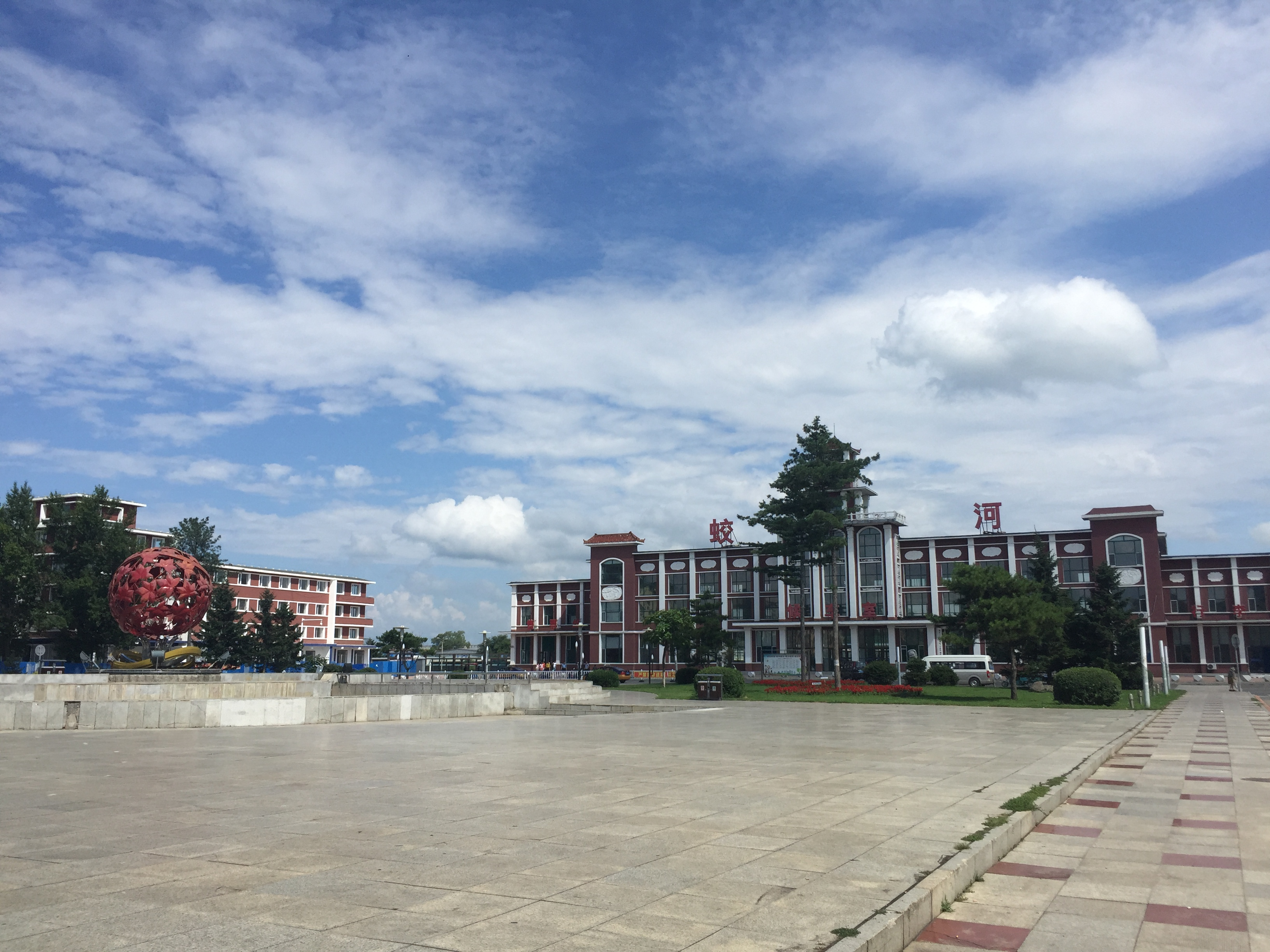
- A view of Jiaohe railway station

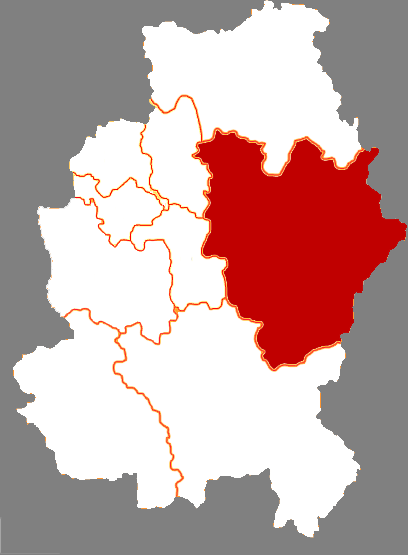
- Jiaohe in Jilin City

- Location in Jilin
- Coordinates: 43°43′26″N 127°20′41″E
- Country: People's Republic of China
- Province: Jilin
- Prefecture-level city: Jilin City
- Seat: Henan Subdistrict (河南街道)

Area
  - County-level city: 6,235 km^{2} (2,407 sq mi)
- Elevation: 345 m (1,132 ft)

Population (2017)
  - County-level city: 489,000
  - Density: 78.4/km^{2} (203/sq mi)
  - Urban: 146,300
- Time zone: UTC+8 (China Standard)
- Postal code: 132500

Jiaohe (Chinese: 蛟河; pinyin: Jiāohé) is a middle-sized county-level city in east-central Jilin province, People's Republic of China, bordering Heilongjiang to the northeast. It is under the administration of Jilin City, 65 kilometres (40 mi) to the west, and it is well known for its production of tobacco. The mayor of the city is Wang Gang (王钢).

The sister city (or twin town) of Jiaohe is Folsom, California, United States.

== Administrative divisions ==
The city administers 7 subdistricts, 8 towns, 1 township, and 1 ethnic township.

The city's 7 subdistricts are Minzhu Subdistrict, Chang'an Subdistrict, Henan Subdistrict, Naizishan Subdistrict, Lafa Subdistrict, Hebei Subdistrict, and Xinnong Subdistrict.

The city's 8 towns are Xinzhan, Tiangang, Baishishan, Piaohe, Huangsongdian, Tianbei, Songjiang, and Qingling.

The city also administers Qianjin Township and Wulin Korean Ethnic Township.

== Geography ==
The city borders the county-level city of Dunhua to the east, Huadian to the south, and Fengman District to the west. The Songhua River and the Mudan River both run through the city.

=== Climate ===
Jiaohe has a four-season, monsoon-influenced, humid continental climate (Köppen Dwa/Dwb). Winters are long (lasting from November to March), cold, and windy, but dry, due to the influence of the Siberian anticyclone, with a January mean temperature of −18.0 °C (−0.4 °F). Spring and autumn are somewhat short transitional periods, with some precipitation, but are usually dry and windy. Summers are very warm and humid, with a prevailing southeasterly wind due to the East Asian monsoon; July averages 21.6 °C (70.9 °F). Snow is usually light during the winter, and annual rainfall is heavily concentrated from June to August.

Climate data for Jiaohe, elevation 295 m (968 ft), (1991–2020 normals, extremes 1971–2010)
Month	Jan	Feb	Mar	Apr	May	Jun	Jul	Aug	Sep	Oct	Nov	Dec	Year
Record high °C (°F)	4.0 (39.2)	10.7 (51.3)	19.0 (66.2)	29.9 (85.8)	32.4 (90.3)	35.7 (96.3)	35.8 (96.4)	34.5 (94.1)	29.7 (85.5)	28.4 (83.1)	19.7 (67.5)	9.1 (48.4)	35.8 (96.4)
Mean daily maximum °C (°F)	−10.7 (12.7)	−4.8 (23.4)	3.3 (37.9)	13.6 (56.5)	20.8 (69.4)	25.4 (77.7)	27.3 (81.1)	26.2 (79.2)	21.4 (70.5)	13.1 (55.6)	1.3 (34.3)	−8.3 (17.1)	10.7 (51.3)
Daily mean °C (°F)	−17.7 (0.1)	−12.1 (10.2)	−2.6 (27.3)	7.0 (44.6)	14.1 (57.4)	19.4 (66.9)	22.1 (71.8)	20.7 (69.3)	14.4 (57.9)	6.2 (43.2)	−4.0 (24.8)	−14.4 (6.1)	4.4 (40.0)
Mean daily minimum °C (°F)	−23.6 (−10.5)	−18.9 (−2.0)	−8.3 (17.1)	0.7 (33.3)	7.9 (46.2)	14.1 (57.4)	17.8 (64.0)	16.5 (61.7)	8.7 (47.7)	0.5 (32.9)	−8.9 (16.0)	−19.8 (−3.6)	−1.1 (30.0)
Record low °C (°F)	−41.8 (−43.2)	−39.2 (−38.6)	−29.3 (−20.7)	−12.8 (9.0)	−7.2 (19.0)	3.9 (39.0)	9.3 (48.7)	5.8 (42.4)	−4.5 (23.9)	−17.8 (0.0)	−31.0 (−23.8)	−37.9 (−36.2)	−41.8 (−43.2)
Average precipitation mm (inches)	5.9 (0.23)	9.3 (0.37)	16.2 (0.64)	34.9 (1.37)	70.4 (2.77)	107.3 (4.22)	161.1 (6.34)	157.5 (6.20)	64.6 (2.54)	34.6 (1.36)	21.5 (0.85)	11.6 (0.46)	694.9 (27.35)
Average precipitation days (≥ 0.1 mm)	5.7	4.7	7.5	9.0	14.0	15.1	16.1	15.4	12.3	9.0	8.6	8.5	125.9
Average snowy days	9.9	7.3	9.6	4.1	0.1	0	0	0	0	2.7	9.8	11.8	55.3
Average relative humidity (%)	70	65	60	56	63	72	81	83	78	68	68	71	70
Mean monthly sunshine hours	145.1	176.1	203.1	201.3	220.5	215.9	198.7	189.8	201.3	181.9	139.4	125.6	2,198.7
Percentage possible sunshine	50	59	55	50	48	47	43	44	54	54	49	45	50
Source 1: China Meteorological Administration
Source 2: Weather China

== Economy ==
The city's main agricultural products include rice, maize, and beans.

Mineral deposits in Jiaohe include coal, copper, iron, nickel, granite, kyanite, diatomite, peat, and dolomite.

== Transport ==
The Changchun-Tumen railway, and the Lafa–Harbin railway both run through the city.

The city's main thoroughfares include National Highway 302 and Jilin Provincial Highway 204.

== See also ==
- Jiaohe Ruins
