= Jiangyuan, Baishan =

Jiangyuan 江源区
- District
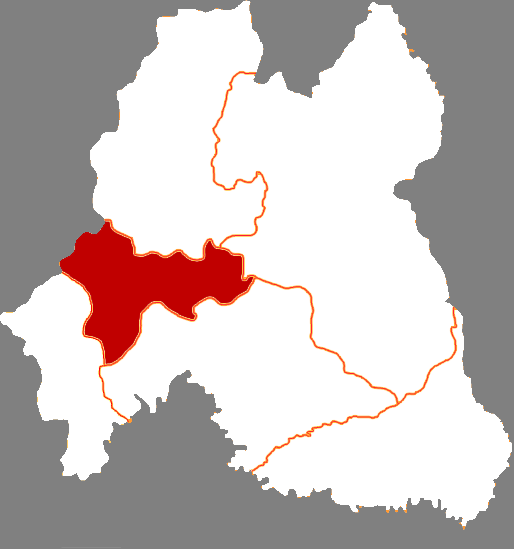
- Location in Baishan

- Location in Jilin
- Coordinates: 42°03′N 126°35′E
- Country: People's Republic of China
- Province: Jilin
- Prefecture-level city: Baishan
- Time zone: UTC+8 (China Standard)

Jiangyuan District (simplified Chinese: 江源区; traditional Chinese: 江源區; pinyin: Jiāngyuán Qū; lit. 'River Source') is a district of the city of Baishan, Jilin province, People's Republic of China.

== Administrative Divisions ==
There are seven towns and four townships.

Towns:

- Sunjiabaozi (孙家堡子镇), Wangou (湾沟镇), Songshu (松树镇), Sanchazi (三岔子镇), Zhazi (砟子镇), Shiren (石人镇), Dayangcha (大阳岔镇)

Townships:

- Dashiren Township (大石人乡), Dashipengzi Township (大石棚子乡), Yumuqiaozi Township (榆木桥子乡)

== Climate ==
Climate data for Jiangyuan District, elevation 544 m (1,785 ft), (1991–2020 normals)
Month	Jan	Feb	Mar	Apr	May	Jun	Jul	Aug	Sep	Oct	Nov	Dec	Year
Mean daily maximum °C (°F)	−6.9 (19.6)	−2.7 (27.1)	4.4 (39.9)	13.3 (55.9)	21.0 (69.8)	24.9 (76.8)	27.4 (81.3)	26.6 (79.9)	21.7 (71.1)	14.1 (57.4)	2.9 (37.2)	−5.7 (21.7)	11.8 (53.1)
Daily mean °C (°F)	−16.4 (2.5)	−11.7 (10.9)	−3.0 (26.6)	5.7 (42.3)	13.2 (55.8)	17.9 (64.2)	21.5 (70.7)	20.4 (68.7)	13.8 (56.8)	5.6 (42.1)	−4.0 (24.8)	−13.7 (7.3)	4.1 (39.4)
Mean daily minimum °C (°F)	−23.4 (−10.1)	−19.4 (−2.9)	−9.7 (14.5)	−1.2 (29.8)	6.0 (42.8)	12.2 (54.0)	17.0 (62.6)	15.9 (60.6)	8.1 (46.6)	−0.9 (30.4)	−9.6 (14.7)	−20.1 (−4.2)	−2.1 (28.2)
Average precipitation mm (inches)	10.3 (0.41)	24.8 (0.98)	31.1 (1.22)	51.0 (2.01)	89.3 (3.52)	120.0 (4.72)	179.7 (7.07)	218.0 (8.58)	81.6 (3.21)	55.9 (2.20)	46.2 (1.82)	20.3 (0.80)	928.2 (36.54)
Average precipitation days (≥ 0.1 mm)	9.4	9.4	11.4	11.4	14.7	16.4	15.9	15.9	11.1	10.4	12.2	12.6	150.8
Average snowy days	9.5	9.8	11.1	4.5	0.2	0	0	0	0.1	2.5	9.9	13.0	60.6
Average relative humidity (%)	68	65	64	59	66	76	81	83	80	70	73	71	71
Mean monthly sunshine hours	143.3	152.3	183.2	186.3	215.7	199.4	190.7	192.7	190.4	177.4	121.0	111.0	2,063.4
Percentage possible sunshine	49	51	49	46	48	44	42	45	51	52	42	39	47
Source: China Meteorological Administration
