= Tiedong, Siping =

Tiedong 铁东区
- District
- Location in Jilin
- Coordinates: 43°09′45″N 124°24′35″E
- Country: People's Republic of China
- Province: Jilin
- Prefecture-level city: Siping
- Time zone: UTC+8 (China Standard)

Tiedong District (simplified Chinese: 铁东区; traditional Chinese: 鐵东區; pinyin: Tiědong Qū; lit. 'railway east district') is a district of Siping City, Jilin, China.

It is the main business area in Siping City.

== Administrative divisions ==
Subdistricts:

- Jiefang Subdistrict (解放街道), Beishichang Subdistrict (北市场街道), Sima Road Subdistrict (四马路街道), Qima Road Subdistrict (七马路街道), Beimen Subdistrict (北门街道), Huangtukang Subdistrict (黄土坑街道), Pingdong Subdistrict (平东街道)

Towns:

- Shanmen (山门镇), Yehe Manchu Ethnic Town (叶赫满族镇)

Townships:

- Changfa Township (长发乡), Chengdong Township (城东乡)
