= Fengman, Jilin City =

Coordinates: 43°46′30″N 126°32′52″E

Fengman 丰满区
- District
- Interactive map of Fengman
- Country: People's Republic of China
- Province: Jilin
- Prefecture-level city: Jilin City
- Seat: Shijingou Subdistrict (石井沟街道)
- Time zone: UTC+8 (China Standard)

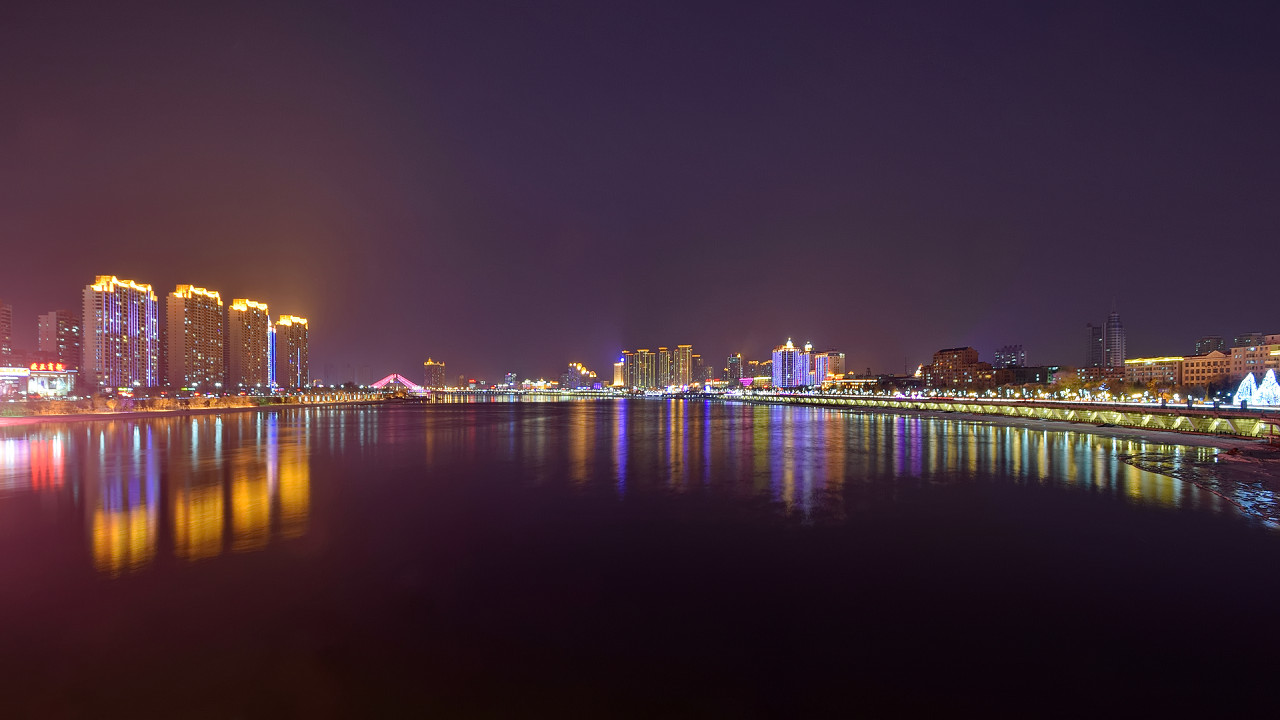
Night scene of downtown Jilin City and Songhua River, view from Jilin Bridge (left: Fengman District/ right: Chuanying District)

Fengman District (simplified Chinese: 丰满区; traditional Chinese: 豐滿區; pinyin: Fēngmǎn Qū) is a district of Jilin City, Jilin, People's Republic of China.

== Administrative divisions ==
Subdistricts:

- Shijingou Subdistrict (石井沟街道), Hongqi Subdistrict (红旗街道), Jiangnan Subdistrict (江南街道), Dachangtun Subdistrict (大长屯街道), Gaoxin Subdistrict (高新街道)

The only town is Wangqi (旺起镇)

Townships:

- Fengman Township (丰满乡), Xiaobaishan Township (小白山乡), Qian'erdao Township (前二道乡), Jiangnan Township (江南乡)
