= Liaoyuan =

Liaoyuan 辽源市 Liao-yüan
- Prefecture-level city
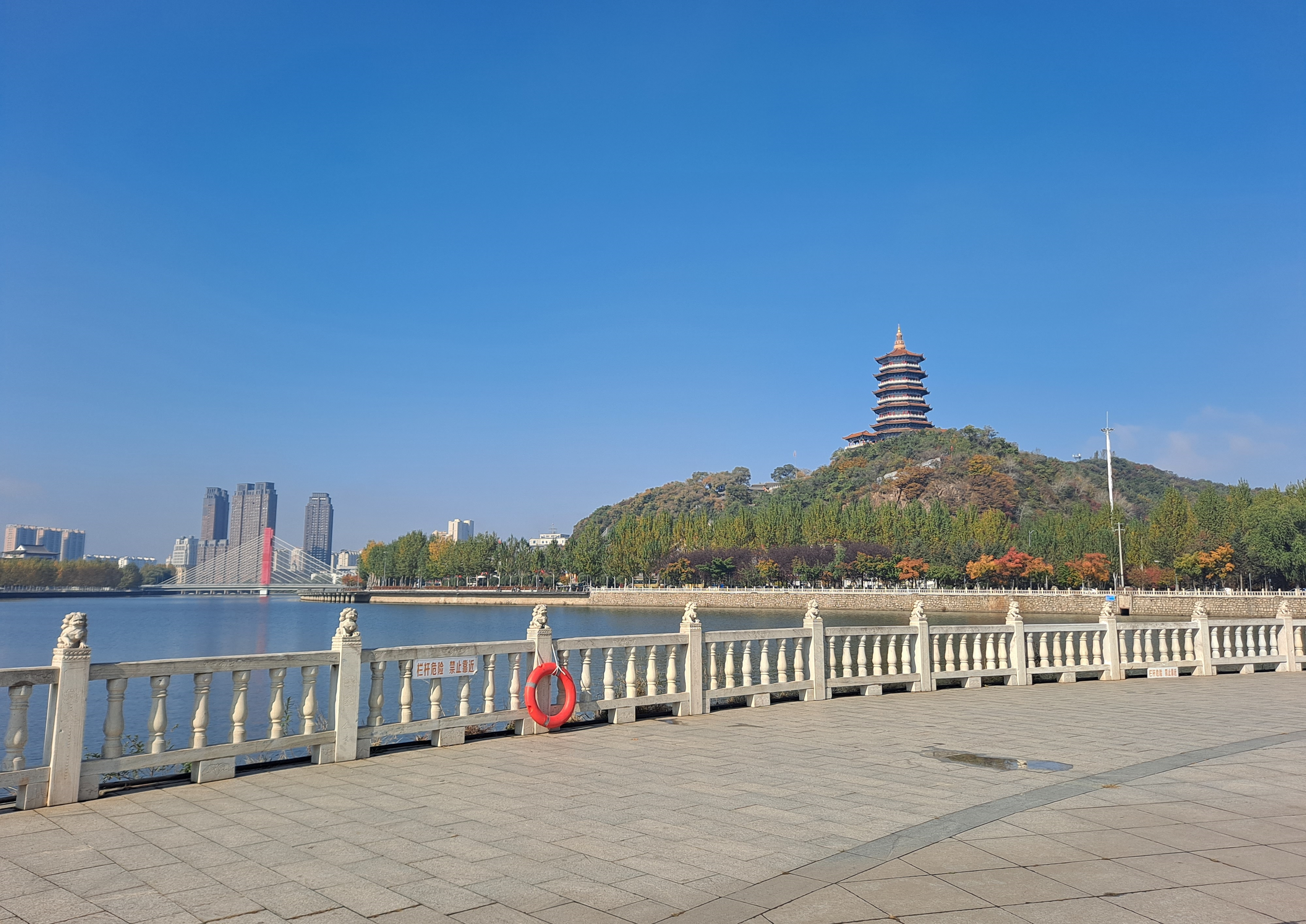
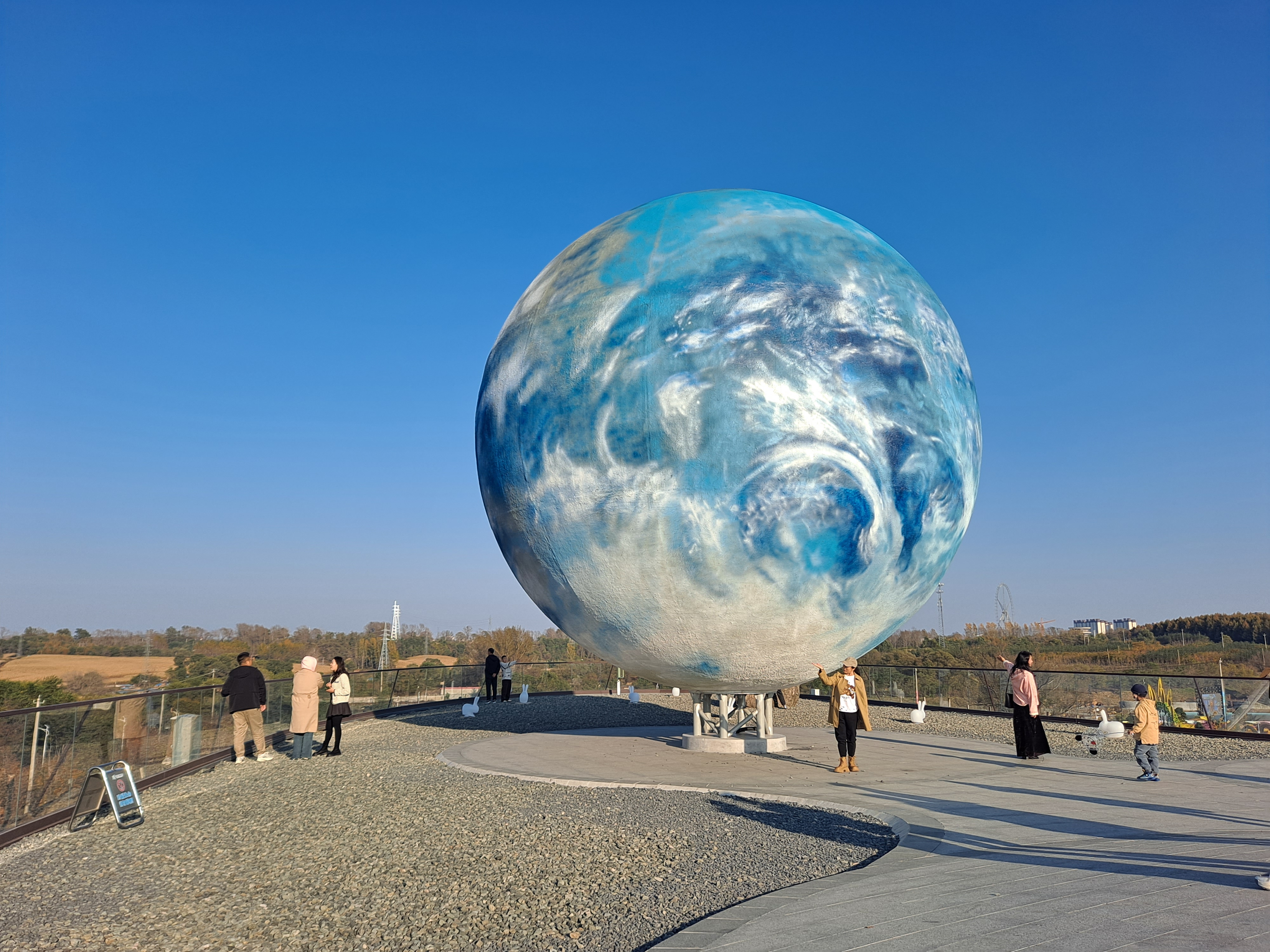
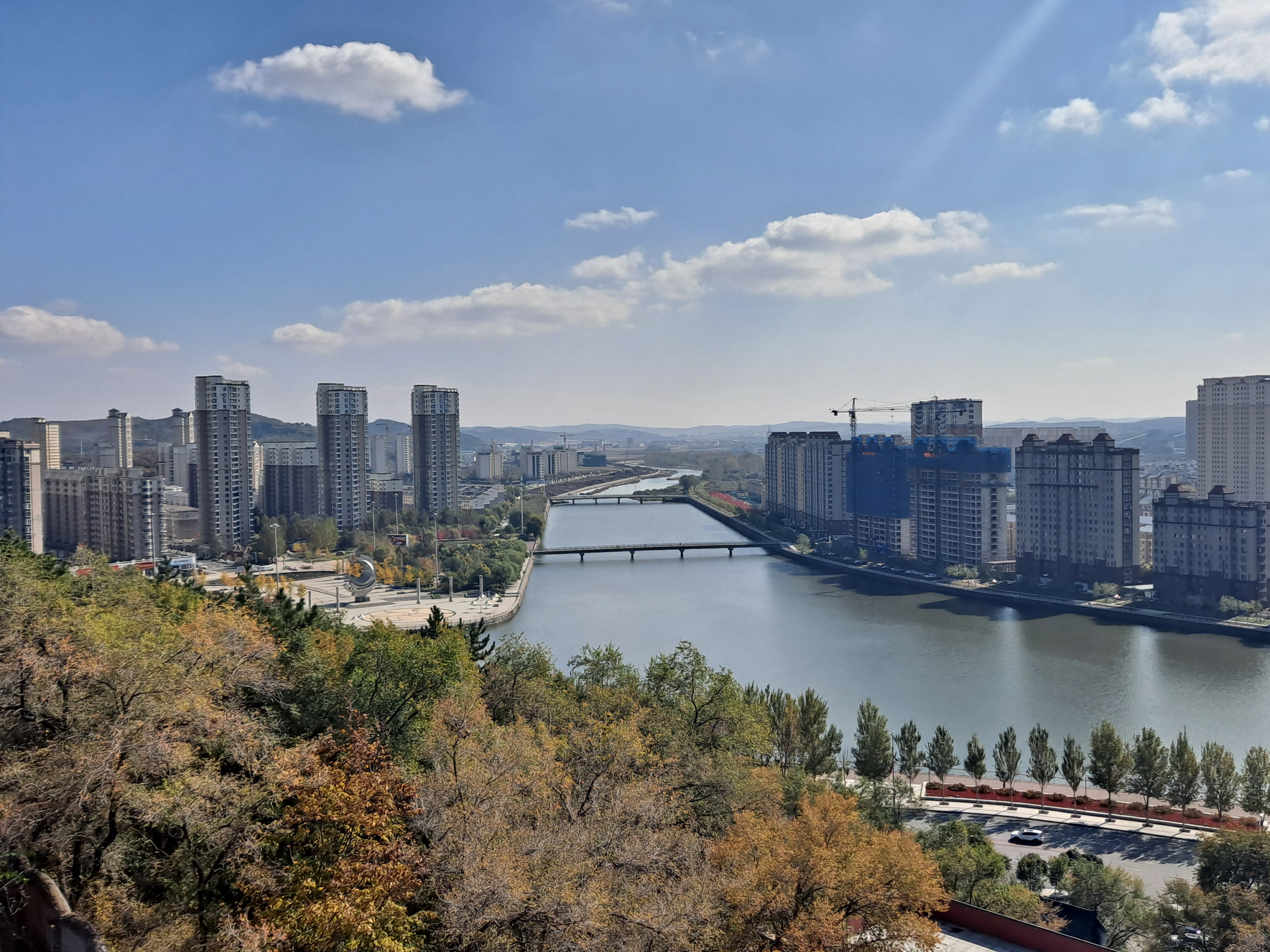
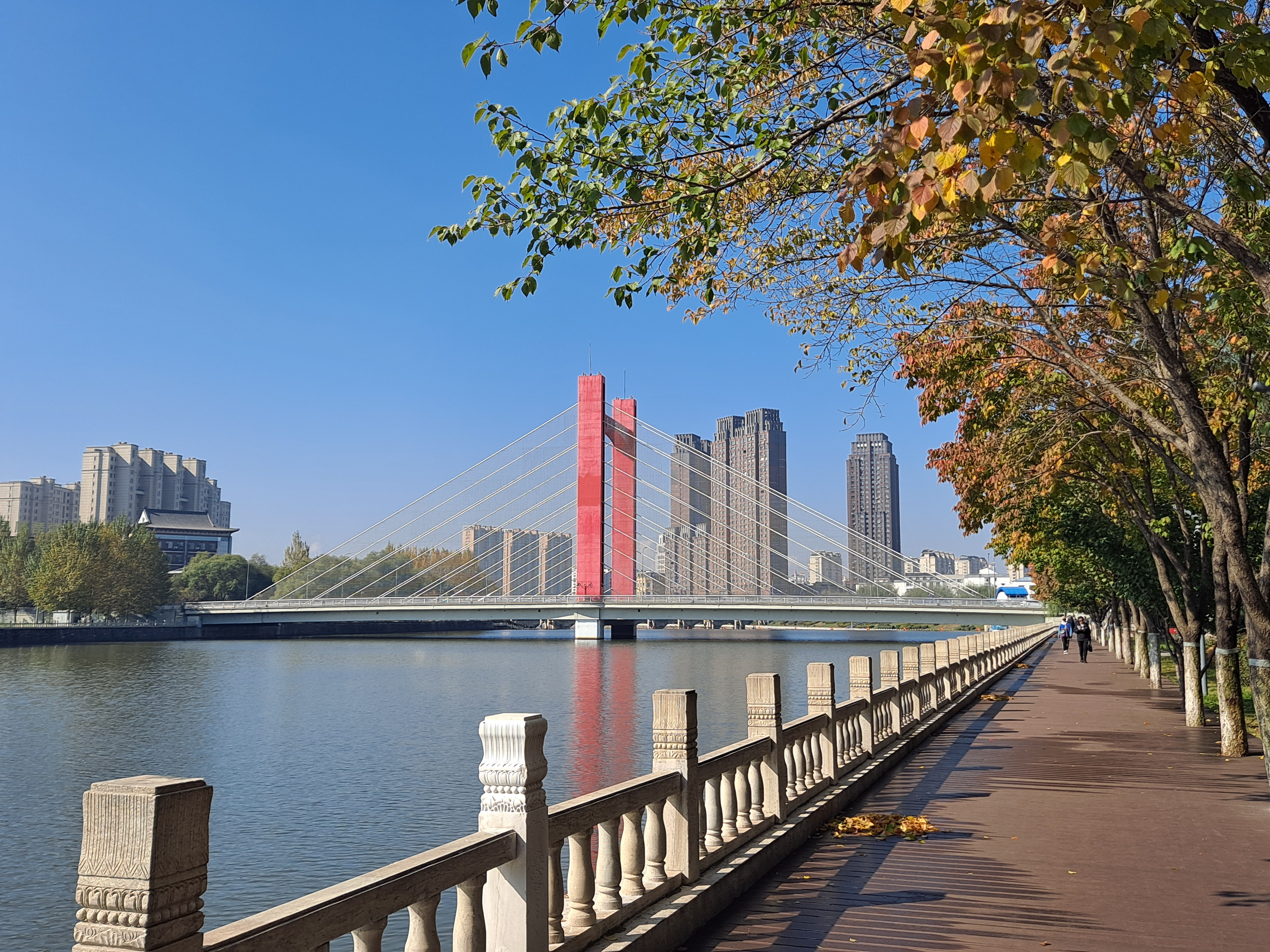
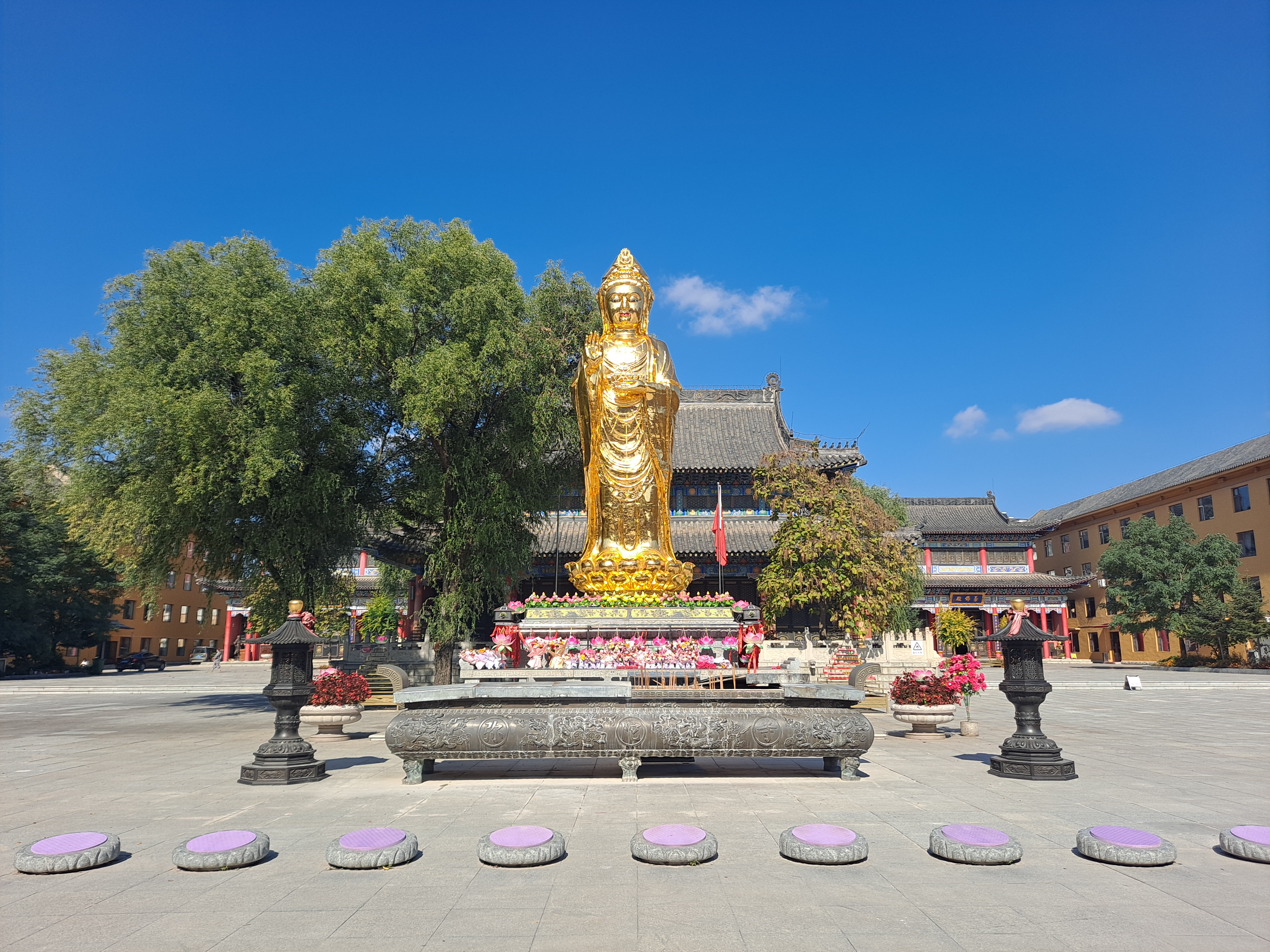
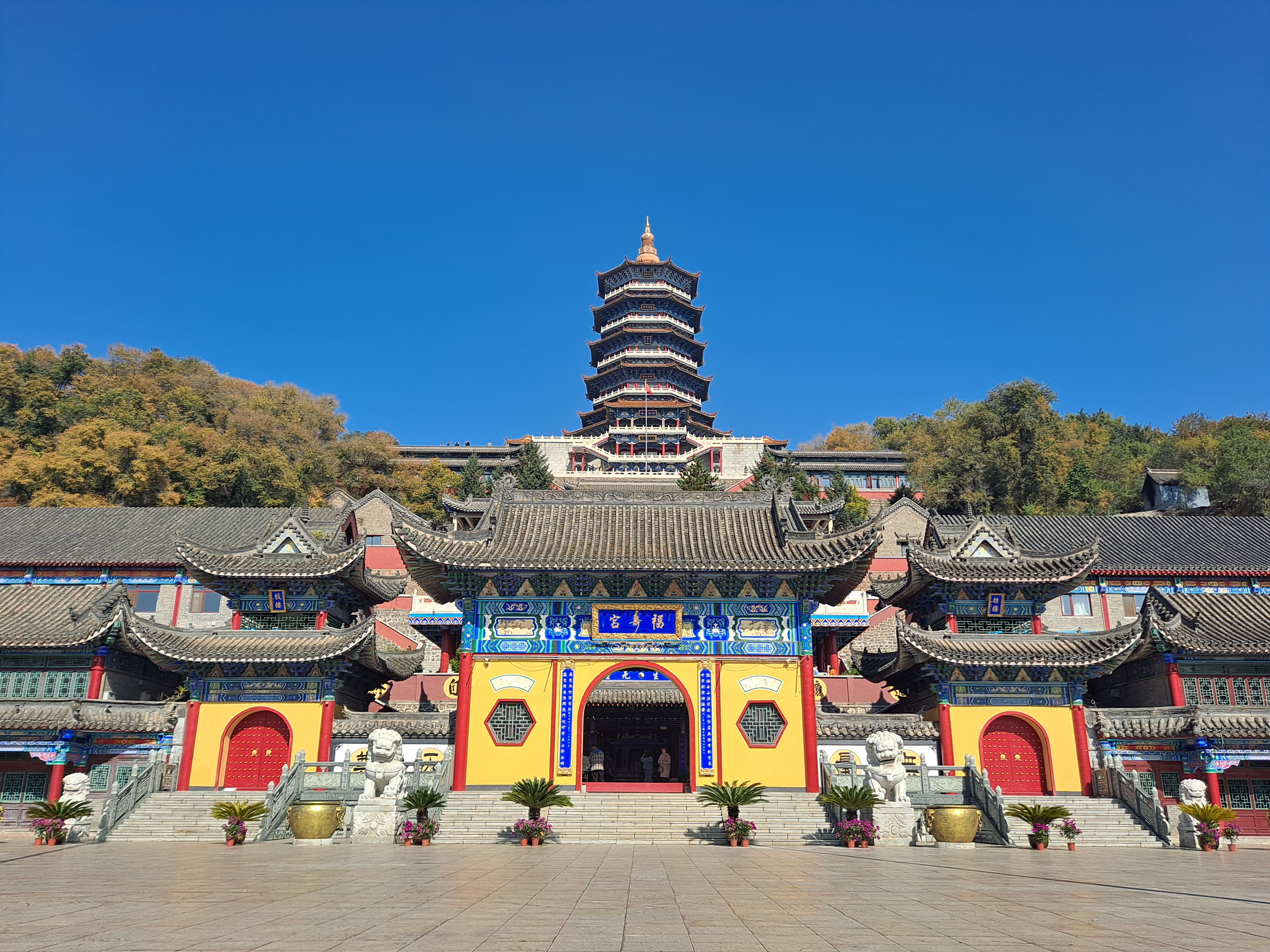
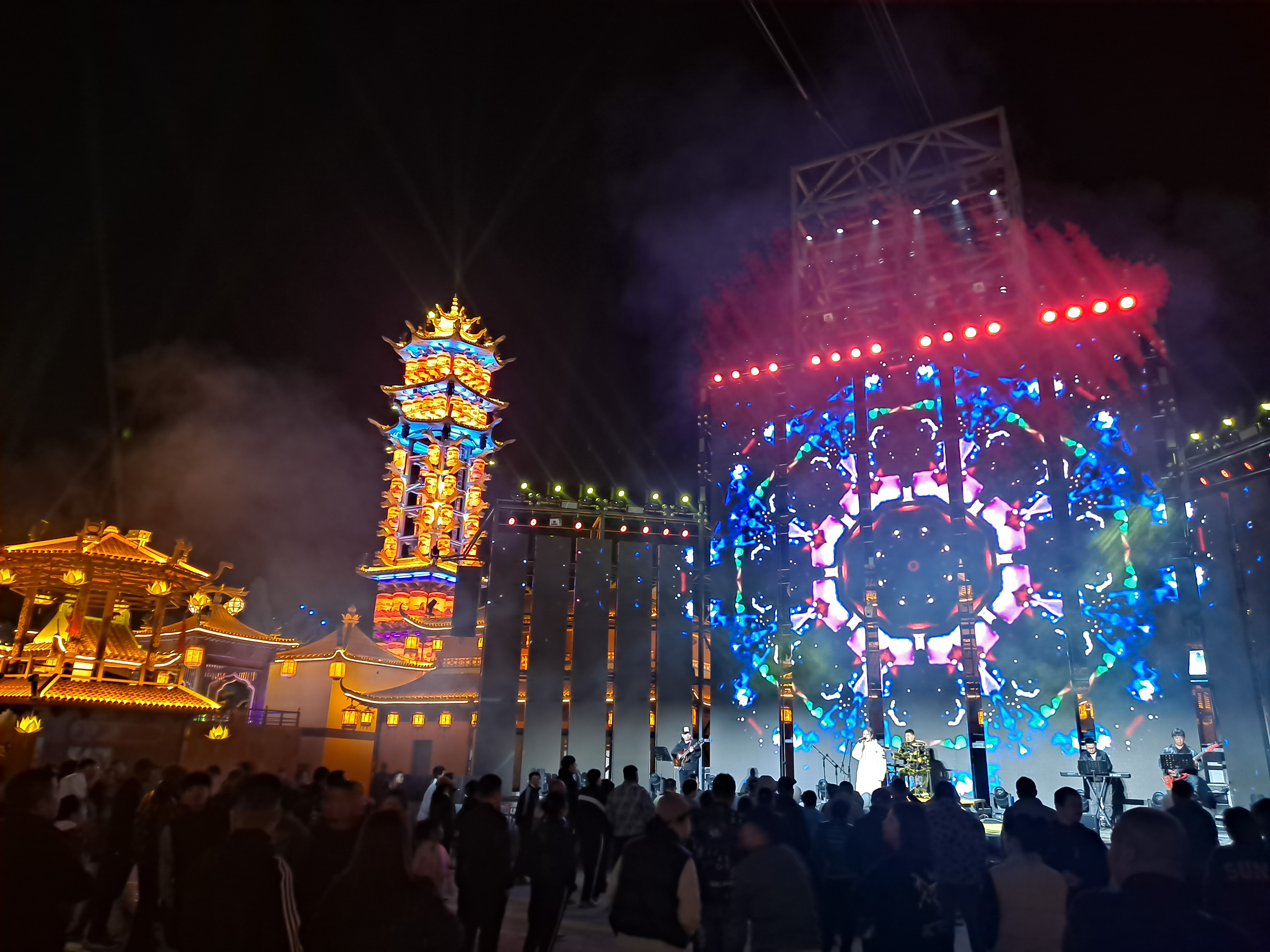
- Longshou Mountain Liaoyuan Zoo and Botanical Garden View of Liaoyuan from Kuixing Tower East Liao River Bridge Maitreya Temple Fushou Palace and Kuixing Building Happy Liaoyuan Carnival
- Nickname: 大疙瘩 ("Great lump")
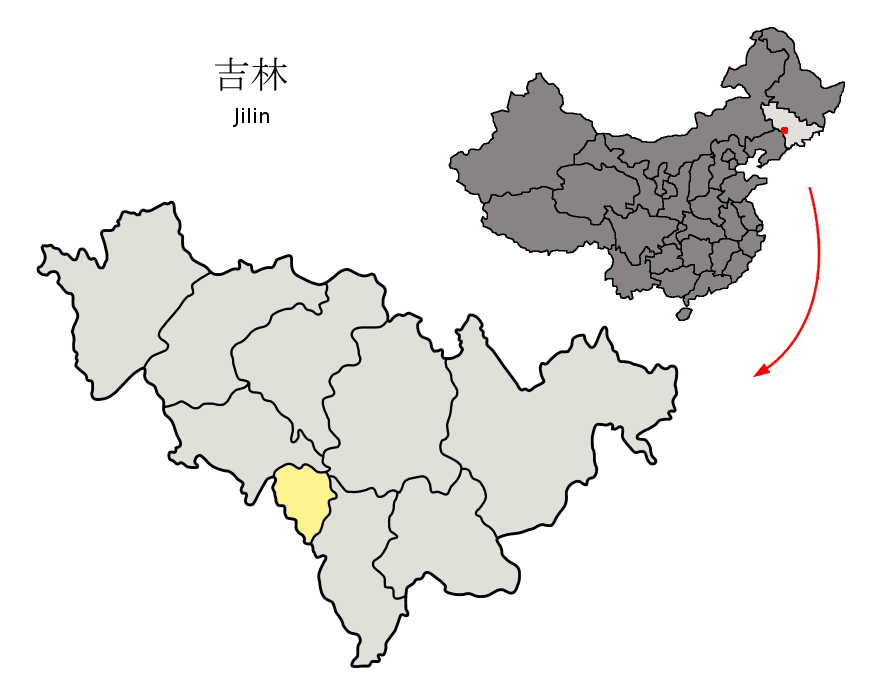
- Liaoyuan City (yellow) in Jilin (light grey) and China

- Location of city centre in Jilin
- Coordinates (Liaoyuan municipal government): 42°53′17″N 125°08′41″E
- Country: People's Republic of China
- Province: Jilin
- County-level divisions: 4
- Incorporated (county): August 4, 1902
- Incorporated (County-level city): October 15, 1948
- Incorporated (Prefecture-level city): October 3, 1983
- Municipal seat: Longshan District

Government
  - Type: Prefecture-level city
  - CPC Liaoyuan Secretary: Wu Lan
  - Mayor: Jin Yuhui

Area
  - Prefecture-level city: 5,125 km^{2} (1,979 sq mi)
  - Urban (2017): 46.30 km^{2} (17.88 sq mi)
- Elevation: 260 m (850 ft)

Population (2010)
  - Prefecture-level city: 1,176,645
  - Density: 229.6/km^{2} (594.6/sq mi)
  - Urban (2017): 475,400
  - Urban density: 10,270/km^{2} (26,590/sq mi)

GDP
  - Prefecture-level city: CN¥ 72.7 billion US$ 11.7 billion
  - Per capita: CN¥ 59,905; US$ 9,618
- Time zone: UTC+8 (China Standard)
- Postal code: 136200
- Area code: 0437
- ISO 3166 code: CN-JL-04
- License Plate Prefix: 吉D

Liaoyuan (simplified Chinese: 辽源; traditional Chinese: 遼源; pinyin: Liáoyuán) is a prefecture-level city in Jilin province, People's Republic of China. It is bounded on the west and south by Tieling of Liaoning province, west and north by Siping, and east by Tonghua and Jilin City. Liaoyuan lies some 100 km (62 mi) south of Changchun, the provincial capital. Covering an area of 5,125 km^{2} (1,979 sq mi), Liaoyuan is the smallest among the prefecture-level divisions of Jilin. Liaoyuan has a total population of 1,176,645 in the prefecture, while the urban area has a population of 462,233.

== History ==
Liaoyuan was an imperial hunting ground during the Qing dynasty, going by the name Shengjing Paddock (盛京圍場). Ordinary citizens were prohibited from entering this region until late 1800s, when waves of immigrants from Hebei, Shandong and Henan began to populate Manchuria (see Chuang Guandong). In 1902, Qing government established Xi'an County (西安縣) in this region, which became today's Xi'an District.

The discovery of coal underground shortly afterwards brought prosperity to the city. Between 1931 and 1945, Xi'an was an important coal-mining city in Manchukuo and also the place where American Army General Jonathan M. Wainwright was held as a prisoner. After World War II, Xi'an County was renamed to Beifeng County (simplified Chinese: 北丰县; traditional Chinese: 北豐縣) to avoid confusion with Xi'an in Shaanxi. During the Chinese Civil War, Xi'an was a focal point of the intense fighting between the Communist and Nationalist forces until the summer of 1947 when it was permanently captured by the Communist force. The city was renamed Liaoyuan (literally the source of the East Liao River) in 1952, and the county previously named Liaoyuan was renamed to Shuangliao. As a county-level city, Liaoyuan was under Siping Prefecture's jurisdiction till 1983, when it became a prefecture-level city, administering two districts and two counties.

== Geography and Climate ==
Liaoyuan has a temperate semi-humid monsoon climate. The average annual sunshine totals 2,580 hours, while the average annual precipitation is just above 620 mm (24 in). The average temperature is 5.78 °C (42.4 °F). Liaoyuan is replete with water resources. There are 56 rivers and streams running through the city, including tributes of Liao River and Songhua River. In addition, Liaoyuan is also rich in timber and mineral resources. Mineral resources such as limestone, marble, coal, silica, and wollastonite are abundant. Forests cover 42% of the city's lands.

Climate data for Liaoyuan, elevation 253 m (830 ft), (1991–2020 normals, extremes 1981–2025)
Month	Jan	Feb	Mar	Apr	May	Jun	Jul	Aug	Sep	Oct	Nov	Dec	Year
Record high °C (°F)	5.7 (42.3)	14.6 (58.3)	24.1 (75.4)	30.2 (86.4)	34.6 (94.3)	36.7 (98.1)	36.0 (96.8)	35.8 (96.4)	31.3 (88.3)	29.2 (84.6)	21.2 (70.2)	12.3 (54.1)	36.7 (98.1)
Mean daily maximum °C (°F)	−7.4 (18.7)	−2.4 (27.7)	5.3 (41.5)	15.3 (59.5)	22.4 (72.3)	26.8 (80.2)	28.6 (83.5)	27.3 (81.1)	22.9 (73.2)	14.6 (58.3)	3.5 (38.3)	−5.2 (22.6)	12.6 (54.7)
Daily mean °C (°F)	−15.3 (4.5)	−9.9 (14.2)	−1.0 (30.2)	8.6 (47.5)	15.9 (60.6)	20.9 (69.6)	23.5 (74.3)	21.9 (71.4)	15.6 (60.1)	7.4 (45.3)	−2.7 (27.1)	−12.0 (10.4)	6.1 (42.9)
Mean daily minimum °C (°F)	−21.5 (−6.7)	−16.6 (2.1)	−7.1 (19.2)	1.7 (35.1)	9.3 (48.7)	15.2 (59.4)	18.8 (65.8)	17.2 (63.0)	9.4 (48.9)	1.2 (34.2)	−8.1 (17.4)	−17.8 (0.0)	0.1 (32.3)
Record low °C (°F)	−41.0 (−41.8)	−36.3 (−33.3)	−27.0 (−16.6)	−13.3 (8.1)	−4.1 (24.6)	3.1 (37.6)	9.9 (49.8)	3.7 (38.7)	−3.3 (26.1)	−14.0 (6.8)	−25.8 (−14.4)	−36.9 (−34.4)	−41.0 (−41.8)
Average precipitation mm (inches)	5.6 (0.22)	8.1 (0.32)	15.4 (0.61)	30.3 (1.19)	60.0 (2.36)	92.9 (3.66)	148.4 (5.84)	169.0 (6.65)	52.3 (2.06)	31.4 (1.24)	20.0 (0.79)	8.8 (0.35)	642.2 (25.29)
Average precipitation days (≥ 0.1 mm)	5.3	4.1	6.2	7.3	10.9	13.5	14.3	14.0	8.5	7.6	6.8	6.7	105.2
Average snowy days	8.1	5.9	6.9	2.3	0	0	0	0	0	1.5	6.4	8.4	39.5
Average relative humidity (%)	71	66	59	53	57	68	79	81	75	68	69	71	68
Mean monthly sunshine hours	172.9	189.1	219.1	216.0	242.0	223.7	201.3	206.7	214.8	197.9	160.2	152.9	2,396.6
Percentage possible sunshine	59	63	59	54	53	49	44	48	58	59	55	55	55
Source: China Meteorological Administration

== Administrative divisions ==
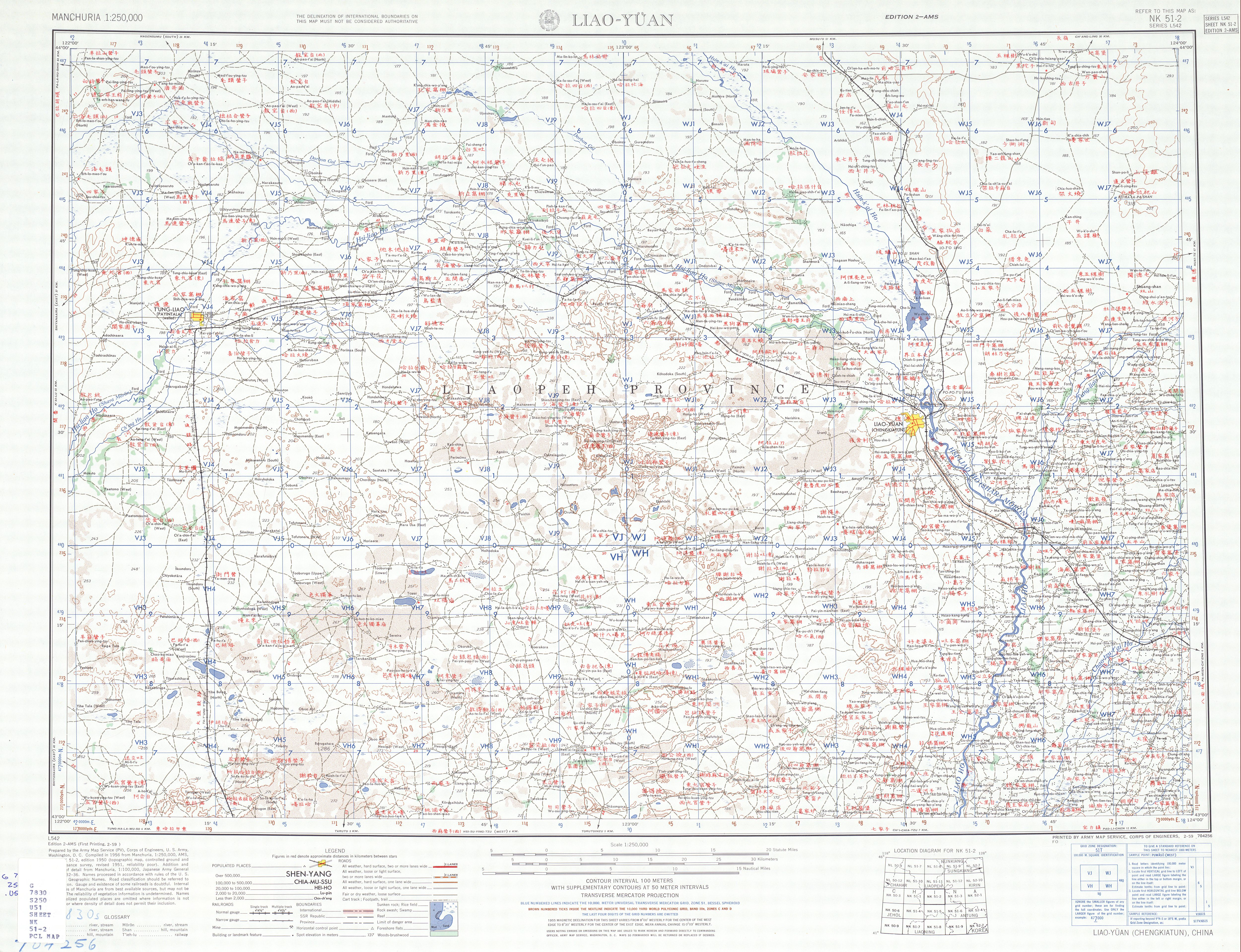
Map including Liaoyuan (labeled as 遼源 LIAO-YÜAN (CHENGKIATUN)) (AMS, 1956)

Map
#	Name	Hanzi	Hanyu Pinyin	Population (2010 est.)	Area (km^{2})	Density (/km^{2})
1	Longshan District	龙山区	Lóngshān Qū	283,045	257	1,101
2	Xi'an District	西安区	Xī'ān Qū	179,188	172	1,042
3	Dongfeng County	东丰县	Dōngfēng Xiàn	408,679	2,522	162
4	Dongliao County	东辽县	Dōngliáo Xiàn	396,121	2,174	182

== Economy ==
Coal mining in Liaoyuan started in late Qing dynasty and continued to be the most important industry for more than 100 years. During the Japanese occupation from 1931 to 1945, Liaoyuan was the second largest coal-mining center of Manchukuo, preceded only by Fushun. This city continued to produce approximately 3 million tons of coal every year till the mid-1990s, when the exhaustion of coal resource brought the economy of this city to a standstill. The city succeeded in transforming its economic structure from a mining oriented one to a light manufacturing oriented one. At present, the city is the largest cotton-sock manufacturing center in China. Furthermore, the aluminum shell of Apple MacBook Pro is also manufactured in this city. Liaoyuan has a GDP of RMB 50 billion in 2011, rising 15.6% year on year.

== Transportation ==
The Changchun-Liaoyuan Expressway and the Siping-Meihekou Railway run through the city. Changchun Airport is within one and a half-hour's drive from Liaoyuan.

== Tourism ==
Guandong deer meat is one of the popular dishes among local people since Liaoyuan has a long history of raising deer.

== Notable people ==
- Xie Jun, Chinese chess grandmaster, former Women's World Chess Champion
- Yan Xuejing, Chinese Errenzhuan and TV-series actress
- Xue Cun, Chinese singer, movie director

== Accident ==
On December 16, 2005, a fire in Liaoyuan Central Hospital killed at least 39 people, 33 of whom were patients. The cause of the fire was wire-aging, as reported by local media.(BBC)

== Sports ==
The 15,000-capacity Liaoyuan Stadium is the largest stadium in the city. It opened in 2006 and it is used mostly for association football matches. The stadium also has an athletics track.

== Sister cities ==
- Cherepovets, Vologda Oblast, Russia
