= County (China) =

County 县 Xiàn
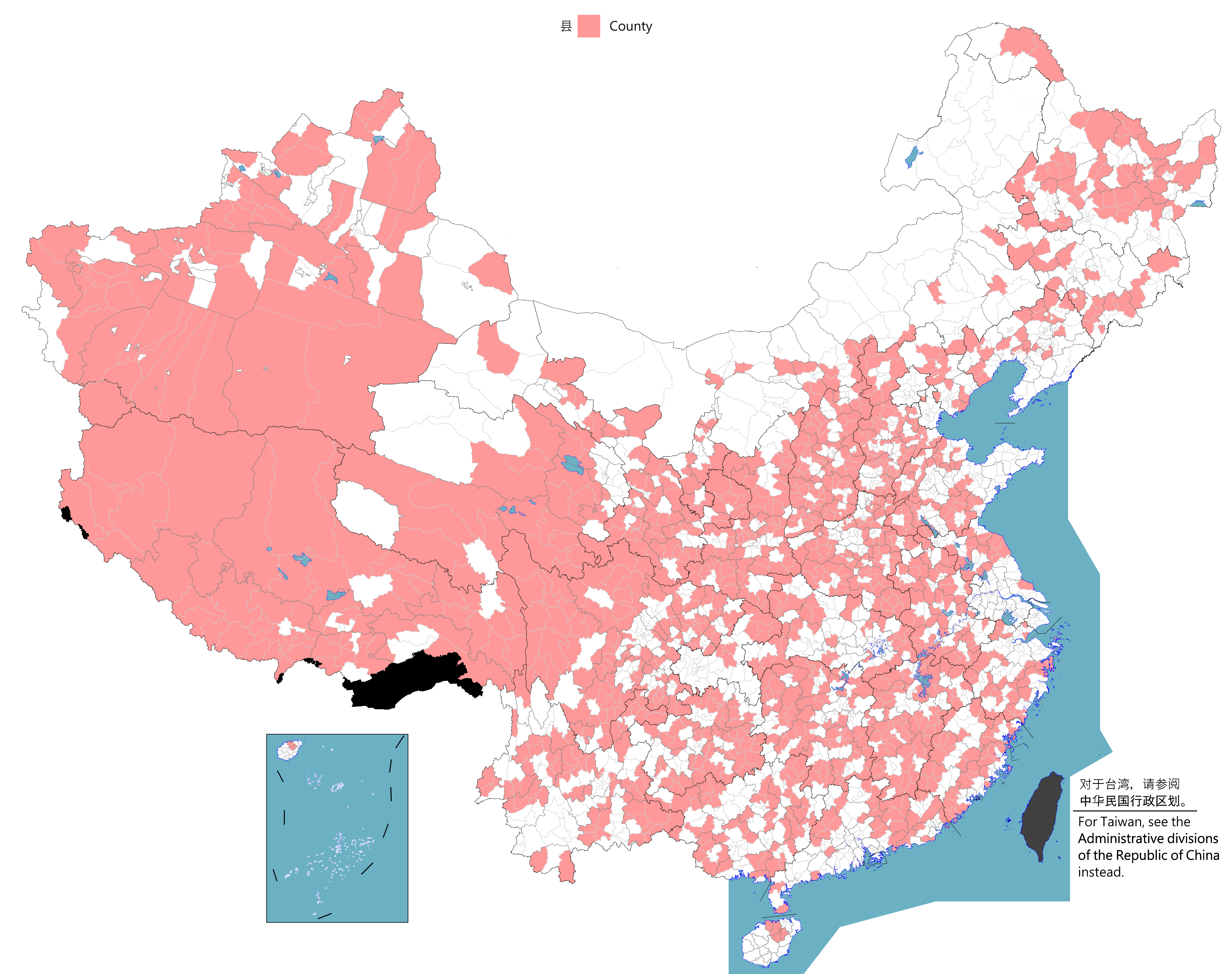
- Category: Third level administrative division of a unitary state
- Location: People's Republic of China
- Found in: Prefectures, Provinces
- Number: 1,319 (1,307 controlled, 11 claimed) (as of 2023)
- Government: Various, Central Government
- Subdivisions: Town, Township

County

Chinese name
- Simplified Chinese: 县
- Traditional Chinese: 縣
Transcriptions
Standard Mandarin
- Hanyu Pinyin: Xiàn

Tibetan name
- Tibetan: རྫོང་། (formerly 宗 in Chinese)
Transcriptions
- Wylie: rdzong
- Tibetan Pinyin: Zong

Zhuang name
- Zhuang: Yen

Korean name
- Hangul: 현
Transcriptions
- Revised Romanization: hyeon
- McCune–Reischauer: hyŏn

Mongolian name
- Mongolian Cyrillic: Шянь
- Mongolian script: ᠰᠢᠶᠠᠨ
Transcriptions
- SASM/GNC: siyan

Uyghur name
- Uyghur: ناھىيە
Transcriptions
- Latin Yëziqi: Nahiye
- Yengi Yeziⱪ: Naⱨiyə
- SASM/GNC: Naĥiyə

Manchu name
- Manchu script: ᡥᡳᠶᠠᠨ
- Möllendorff: hiyan

Kazakh name
- Kazakh: اۋدان аудан audan

Kyrgyz name
- Kyrgyz: وودان оодан oodan

Daur name
- Daur: guas

Oroqen name
- Oroqen: jaamun

A county (县) is an administrative division in China. It is constitutionally the subdivision of a province, while prefecture-level divisions also exist as a layer between counties and provinces.

County-level administrative divisions also include autonomous counties, county-level cities, banners, autonomous banners and municipal districts. There are 1,355 counties in mainland China out of a total of 2,851 county-level divisions.

== History ==
Xian have existed since the Warring States period and were set up nationwide by the Qin dynasty. The number of counties in China proper gradually increased from dynasty to dynasty. As Qin Shi Huang reorganized the counties after his unification, there were about 1,000. Under the Eastern Han dynasty, the number of counties increased to above 1,000. About 1400 existed when the Sui dynasty abolished the commandery level (郡 jùn), which was the level just above counties, and demoted some commanderies to counties. The current number of counties mostly resembled that of the later years of Qing dynasty. Changes of location and names of counties in Chinese history have been a major field of research in Chinese historical geography, especially from the 1960s to the 1980s.

In Imperial China, the county was a significant administrative unit because it marked the lowest level of the imperial bureaucratic structure; in other words, it was the lowest level that the government reached. Government below the county level was often undertaken through informal non-bureaucratic means, varying between dynasties. The head of a county was the magistrate, who oversaw both the day-to-day operations of the county as well as civil and criminal cases.

During the Republican period, counties were the second level administrative divisions of its provinces. After the Chinese Civil War, counties became subordinate to prefectural level cities while the previous structure is retained. The counties became directly governed by the Executive Yuan after the provinces became streamlined in 1998, but they were fully abolished in 2018.

== Autonomous counties ==
Autonomous counties (自治县; zìzhìxiàn) are a special class of counties in mainland China reserved for non-Han Chinese ethnic minorities. Autonomous counties are found all over China, and are given, by law, more legislative power than regular counties.

There are 117 autonomous counties in mainland China.

== Government ==
As the Chinese Communist Party (CCP) is central to directing government policy in mainland China, every level of administrative division has a local CCP committee. A county's is called the secretary (中共县委书记), the de facto highest office of the county. Policies are carried out via the people's government of the county, and its head is called the county governor (县长). The governor is often also one of the deputy secretaries in the CCP Committee.

== See also ==
- Counties of China — historical
- List of counties in the People's Republic of China
- List of county-level divisions of China
- History of the administrative divisions of China
- Attached county, a former sort of xian in late Imperial China
- County (Taiwan)
