= List of township-level divisions of Jilin =

Location of Jilin province in China

This is a list of township-level divisions of the province of Jilin, People's Republic of China (PRC). After province, prefecture, and county-level divisions, township-level divisions constitute the formal fourth-level administrative divisions of the PRC. There are a total of 1,023 such divisions in Jilin, divided into 252 subdistricts, 427 towns, 4 ethnic towns, 312 townships, and 28 ethnic townships. This list is divided first into the prefecture-level divisions then the county-level divisions.

== Changchun ==
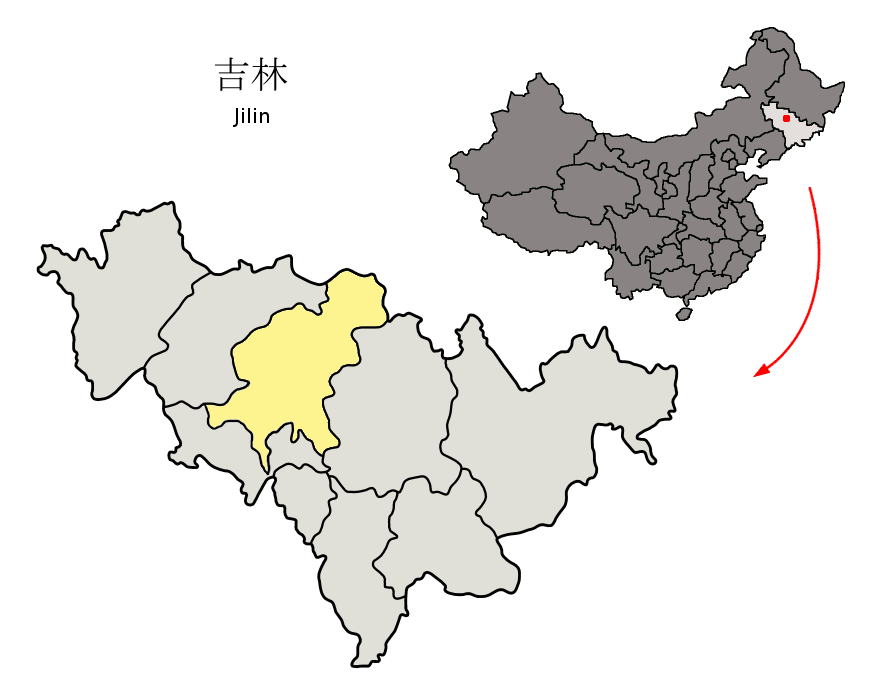
Location of Changchun in the province

=== Chaoyang District ===
Subdistricts:

- Nanhu Subdistrict (南湖街道), Hongqi Subdistrict (红旗街道), Mengjia Subdistrict (孟家街道), Baiju Subdistrict (白菊街道), Jianshe Subdistrict (建设街道), Yongchang Subdistrict (永昌街道), Chongqing Subdistrict, Guilin Subdistrict (桂林街道), Kuanping Subdistrict (宽平街道), Huxi Subdistrict (湖西街道), Qinghe Subdistrict (清和街道)

Towns:

- Datun (大屯镇), Leshan (乐山镇)

Townships:

- Shuangde Township (双德乡), Yongchun Township (永春乡)

=== Erdao District ===
Subdistricts:

- Heshun Subdistrict (和顺街道), Dongsheng Subdistrict, Rongguang Subdistrict (荣光街道), Jilin Subdistrict (吉林街道), Dongzhan Subdistrict (东站街道), Yuanda Subdistrict (远达街道), Balibao Subdistrict (八里堡街道)

Towns:

- Sandao (三道镇), Quannongshan (劝农山镇)

Townships:

- Yingjun Township (英俊乡), Sijia Township (四家乡), Quanyan Township (泉眼乡)

=== Kuancheng District ===
Subdistricts:

- Xinfa Subdistrict (新发街道), Shengli Subdistrict (胜利街道), Nanguang Subdistrict (南广街道), Dongguang Subdistrict (东广街道), Zhanqian Subdistrict (站前街道), Xiguang Subdistrict (西广街道), Liuying Subdistrict, Qunying Subdistrict (群英街道), Kaixuan Subdistrict (凯旋街道), Xingye Subdistrict (兴业街道), Tuanshan Subdistrict (团山街道), Dong'an Subdistrict (东安街道), Changtong Subdistrict (长通街道)

Towns:

- Xinglongshan (兴隆山镇), Lanjia (兰家镇)

The only township is Fenjin Township (奋进乡)

=== Nanguan District ===
Subdistricts:

- Nanjie Subdistrict (南街街道), Taoyuan Subdistrict (桃源街道), Quan'an Subdistrict (全安街道), Yongji Subdistrict (永吉街道), Shuguang Subdistrict (曙光街道), Nanling Subdistrict (南岭街道), Ziqiang Subdistrict (自强街道), Minkang Subdistrict (民康街道), Panshi Subdistrict (磐石街道), Qingming Subdistrict (清明街道), Xinchun Subdistrict (新春街道), Xiwu Subdistrict (西五街道)

Towns:

- Jingyue (净月镇), Xinlicheng (新立城镇), Xinhu (新湖镇)

Townships:

- Xingfu Township (幸福乡), Nonglin Township (农林乡)

=== Luyuan District ===
Subdistricts:

- Chuncheng Subdistrict (春城街道), Puyang Subdistrict (普阳街道), Zhengyang Subdistrict (正阳街道), Dongfeng Subdistrict (东风街道), Jincheng Subdistrict (锦程街道), Tiexi Subdistrict (铁西街道), Qingnian Road Subdistrict (青年路街道)

The only town is Hexin (合心镇)

Townships:

- Chengxi Township (城西乡), Xixin Township (西新乡)

=== Shuangyang District ===
Subdistricts:

- Pinghu Subdistrict (平湖街道), Yunshan Subdistrict (云山街道), Sheling Subdistrict (奢岭街道), Shanhe Subdistrict

Towns:

- Taiping (太平镇), Luxiang (鹿乡镇), Tuding (土顶镇), Qijia (齐家镇)

The only township is Shuangyingzi Hui Ethnic Township (双营子回族乡)

=== Dehui ===
Subdistricts:

- Shengli Subdistrict (胜利街道), Jianshe Subdistrict (建设街道), Huifa Subdistrict (惠发街道), Xiajiadian Subdistrict (夏家店街道)

Towns:

- Daqingzui (大青嘴镇), Guojia (郭家镇), Songhuajiang (松花江镇), Dajiagou (达家沟镇), Dafangshen (大房身镇), Chalukou (岔路口镇), Zhuchengzi (朱城子镇), Buhai (布海镇), Tiantai (天台镇), Caiyuanzi (菜园子镇)

Townships:

- Tongtai Township (同太乡), Biangang Township (边岗乡), Wutai Township (五台乡), Chaoyang Township (朝阳乡)

=== Jiutai ===
Subdistricts:

- Tuanjie Subdistrict (团结街道), Gongnong Subdistrict (工农街道), Nanshan Subdistrict (南山街道), Yingcheng Subdistrict (营城街道), Huoshiling Subdistrict (火石岭街道)

Towns:

- Tumenling (土们岭镇), Xiyingcheng (西营城镇), Mushihe (沐石河镇), Qitamu (其塔木镇), Shanghewan (上河湾镇), Yinmahe (饮马河镇), Chengzijie (城子街镇), Xinglong (兴隆镇), Weizigou (苇子沟镇)

Townships:

- Hujia Hui Ethnic Township (胡家回族乡), Mangka Manchu Ethnic Township (莽卡满族乡)

=== Yushu ===
Subdistricts:

- Huachang Subdistrict (华昌街道), Zhengyang Subdistrict (正阳街道), Peiying Subdistrict (培英街道), Chengjiao Subdistrict (城郊街道)

Towns:

- Sihe (泗河镇), Daling (大岭镇), Dapo (大坡镇), Huaijia (怀家镇), Tuqiao (土桥镇), Xinli (新立镇), Heilin (黑林镇), Wukeshu (五棵树镇), Minjia (闵家镇), Xiangyang, Gongpeng (弓棚镇), Baoshou (保寿镇), Xiushui (秀水镇), Liujia (刘家镇), Bahao (八号镇), Xinzhuang (新庄镇)

Townships:

- Huancheng Township (环城乡), Chengfa Township (城发乡), Lihe Township (李合乡), Yujia Township (于家乡), Qingding Township (青顶乡), Shisihu Township (十四户乡), Guangming Township (光明乡), Xiejia Township (谢家乡), Fu'an Township (福安乡), Dayu Township (大于乡), Xuanfeng Township (先锋乡), Qianjin Township (前进乡), Wulong Township (武龙乡), Dagang Township (大岗乡), Shuangjing Township (双井乡), Hongxing Township (红星乡), Siyu Township (恩育乡), Tai'an Township (太安乡), Yumin Township (育民乡), Qingshan Township (青山乡), Yanhe Korean Ethnic Township (延和朝鲜族乡)

=== Nong'an County ===
Towns:

- Nong'an (农安镇), Fulongquan (伏龙泉镇), Halahai (哈拉海镇), Kaoshan (靠山镇), Kai'an (开安镇), Shaoguo (烧锅镇), Gaojiadian (高家店镇), Huajia (华家镇), Sanshengyu (三盛玉镇), Bajilei (巴吉垒镇)

Townships:

- Qiangang Township (前岗乡), Longwang Township (龙王乡), Sangang Township (三岗乡), Wanshun Township (万顺乡), Yangshulin Township (杨树林乡), Yong'an Township (永安乡), Qingshankou Township (青山口乡), Huangyuquan Township (黄鱼圈乡), Xinnong Township (新农乡), Wanjinta Township (万金塔乡), Xiaochengzi Township (小城子乡)

== Baicheng ==
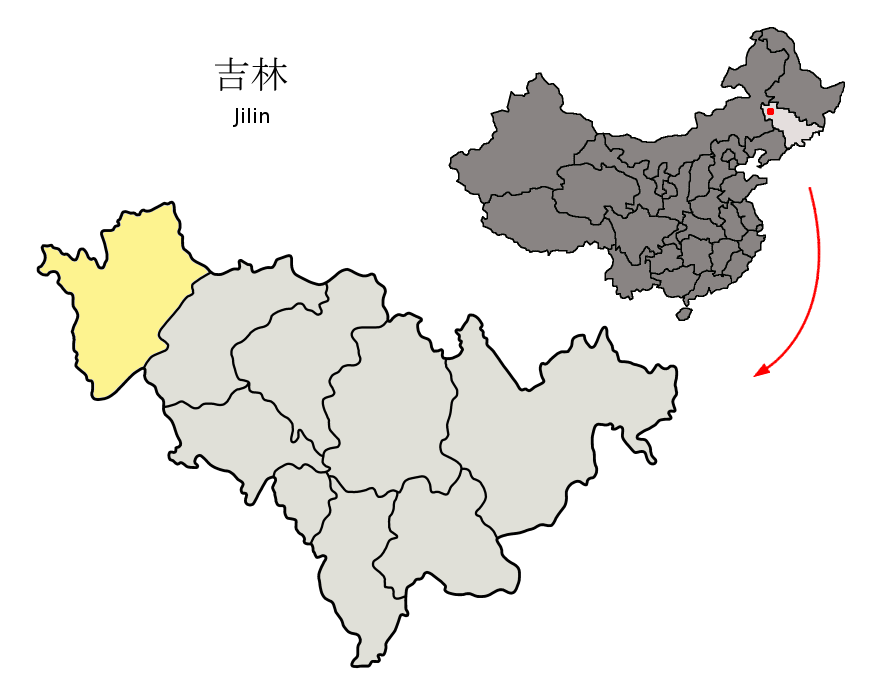
Location of Baicheng in the province

=== Taobei District ===
Subdistricts:

- Haiming Subdistrict (海明街道), Changqing Subdistrict (长庆街道), Ruiguang Subdistrict (瑞光街道), Mingren Subdistrict (明仁街道), Tiedong Subdistrict (铁东街道), Chengnan Subdistrict (城南街道), Xinli Subdistrict (新立街道), Xingfu Subdistrict (幸福街道), Xinhua Subdistrict (新华街道), Baoping Subdistrict (保平街道), Xijiao Subdistrict (保平街道)

Towns:

- Ping'an (平安镇), Qingshan (青山镇), Linhai (林海镇), Taohe (洮河镇), Pingtai (平台镇), Daobao (到保镇), Lingxia (岭下镇)

Townships:

- Dongfeng Township (东风乡), Sanhe Township (三合乡), Dongsheng Township (东胜乡), Jinxiang Township (金祥乡), Deshun Mongol Ethnic Township (德顺蒙古族乡)

=== Da'an ===
Subdistricts:

- Huiyang Subdistrict (慧阳街道), Linjiang Subdistrict (临江街道), Changhong Subdistrict (长虹街道), Anbei Subdistrict (安北街道), Jinhua Subdistrict (锦华街道)

Towns:

- Yueliangpao (月亮泡镇), Anguang (安广镇), Fengshou (丰收镇), Xinping'an (新平安镇), Liangjiazi (两家子镇), Sheli (舍力镇), Dagangzi (大岗子镇), Chagan (叉干镇), Longzhao (龙沼镇), Taishan (太山镇), Shaoguo (烧锅镇), Lesheng (乐胜镇)

Townships:

- Sikeshu Township (四棵树乡), Lianhe Township (联合乡), Dalai Township (大赉乡), Honggangzi Township (红岗子乡), Haituo Township (海坨乡), Xin'aili Mongol Ethnic Township (新艾里蒙古族乡)

=== Taonan ===
Subdistricts:

- Tuanjie Subdistrict (团结街道), Fuwen Subdistrict (富文街道), Guangming Subdistrict (光明街道), Xinglong Subdistrict (兴隆街道), Yongkang Subdistrict (永康街道), Tongda Subdistrict (通达街道), Taofu Subdistrict (洮府街道), Xiangyang Subdistrict (向阳街道)

Towns:

- Wafang (瓦房镇), Wanbao (万宝镇), Heishui (黑水镇), Najin (那金镇), Anding (安定镇), Fushun (福顺乡)

Townships:

- Wanbao Township (万宝乡), Jubao Township (聚宝乡), Dongsheng Township (东升乡), Yema Township (野马乡), Yongmao Township (永茂乡), Xingye Township (兴业乡), Jiaoliuhe Township (蛟流河乡), Datong Township (大通乡), Erlong Township (二龙乡), Hulitu Mongol Ethnic Township (胡力吐蒙古族乡), Huhecheli Mongol Ethnic Township (呼和车力蒙古族乡)

=== Tongyu County ===
Towns:

- Kaitong (开通镇), Zhanyu (瞻榆镇), Shuanggang (双岗镇), Xinglongshan (兴隆山镇), Bianzhao (边昭镇), Hongxing (鸿兴镇), Xinhua (新华镇), Wulanhua (乌兰花镇)

Townships:

- Yangjing Township (羊井乡), Yongqing Township (永青乡), Xinfa Township (新发乡), Xinxing Township (新兴乡), Tuanjie Township (团结乡), Shihuadao Township (十花道乡), Bamian Township (八面乡), Sugongtuo Township (苏公坨乡), Xianghai Mongol Ethnic Township (向海蒙古族乡), Baolawendu Mongol Ethnic Township (包拉温都蒙古族乡)

=== Zhenlai County ===
Towns:

- Zhenlai (镇赉镇), Tanyu (坦途镇), Dongzhan (东屏镇), Datun (大屯镇), Daobao (到保镇), Yanjiang (沿江镇), Wukeshu (五棵树镇)

Townships:

- Danchai Township (丹岱乡), Chaitai Township (岔台乡), Heiyupao Township (黑鱼泡乡), Shengli Township (胜利乡), Baomin Township (保民乡), Jianping Township (建平乡), Gashigen Township (嘎什根乡), Yinghua Township (英华乡), Hatuqi Mongol Ethnic Township (哈吐气蒙古族乡), Momoge Mongol Ethnic Township (莫莫格蒙古族乡)

== Baishan ==
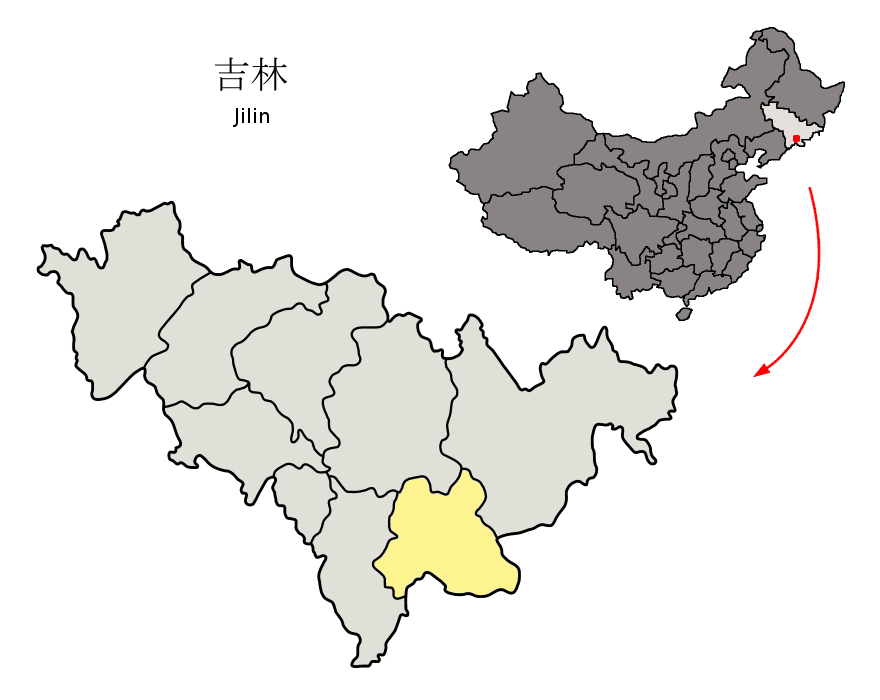
Location of Baishan in the province

=== Hunjiang District ===
Subdistricts:

- Xinjian Subdistrict (新建街道), Tonggou Subdistrict (通沟街道), Dongxing Subdistrict (东兴街道), Hongqi Subdistrict (红旗街道), Banshi Subdistrict (板石街道), Hekou Subdistrict (河口街道), Chengnan Subdistrict (城南街道), Jiangbei Subdistrict (江北街道)

Towns:

- Qidaojiang (七道江镇), Liudaojiang (六道江镇), Hongtuya (红土崖镇), Sandaogou (三道沟镇)

=== Jiangyuan District ===
Towns:

- Sunjiabaozi (孙家堡子镇), Wangou (湾沟镇), Songshu (松树镇), Sanchazi (三岔子镇), Zhazi (砟子镇), Shiren (石人镇), Dayangcha (大阳岔镇)

Townships:

- Dashiren Township (大石人乡), Dashipengzi Township (大石棚子乡), Yumuqiaozi Township (榆木桥子乡)

=== Linjiang ===
Subdistricts:

- Jianguo Subdistrict (建国街道), Xinshi Subdistrict (新市街道), Xinglong Subdistrict (兴隆街道), Dahu Subdistrict (大湖街道), Sengong Subdistrict (森工街道), Dalizi

Towns:

- Huashu (桦树镇), Liudaogou (六道沟镇), Weishahe (苇沙河镇), Huashan (花山镇), Naozhi (闹枝镇), Sidaogou (四道沟镇)

The only township is Mayihe Township (蚂蚁河乡)

=== Changbai Korean Autonomous County ===
Towns:

- Changbai (长白镇 / 장백진), Shisidaogou (十四道沟镇 / 십사도구진), Badaogou (八道沟镇 / 팔도구진), Malugou (马鹿沟镇 / 마록구진), Shi'erdaogou (十二道沟镇 / 십이도구진), Xinfangzi (新房子镇 / 신방자진), Baoquanshan (宝泉山镇 / 보천산진)

The only township is Longgang Township (龙岗乡 / 금화향)

=== Fusong County ===
Towns:

- Fusong (抚松镇), Songjianghe (松江河镇), Quanyang (泉阳镇), Xianrenqiao (仙人桥镇), Xingcan (兴参镇), Xintunzi (新屯子镇), Wanliang (万良镇), Lushuihe (露水河镇), Donggang (东岗镇), Manjiang (漫江镇), Yushu (榆树镇), Beigang (北岗镇)

Townships:

- Xinglong Township (兴隆乡), Xigang Township (西岗乡), Choushui Township (抽水乡), Songjiang Township (松江乡), Yanjiang Township (沿江乡), Songjiao Township (松郊乡)

=== Jingyu County ===
Towns:

- Jingyu (靖宇镇), Sandaohu (三道湖镇), Huayuankou (花园口镇), Xinancha (西南岔镇), Longquan (龙泉镇), Na'erhong (那尔轰镇), Jingshan (景山镇)

Townships:

- Yushuchuan Township (榆树川乡), Yanping Township (燕平乡), Dongxing Township (东兴乡), Chisong Township (赤松乡), Mengjiang Township (濛江乡)

== Jilin City ==
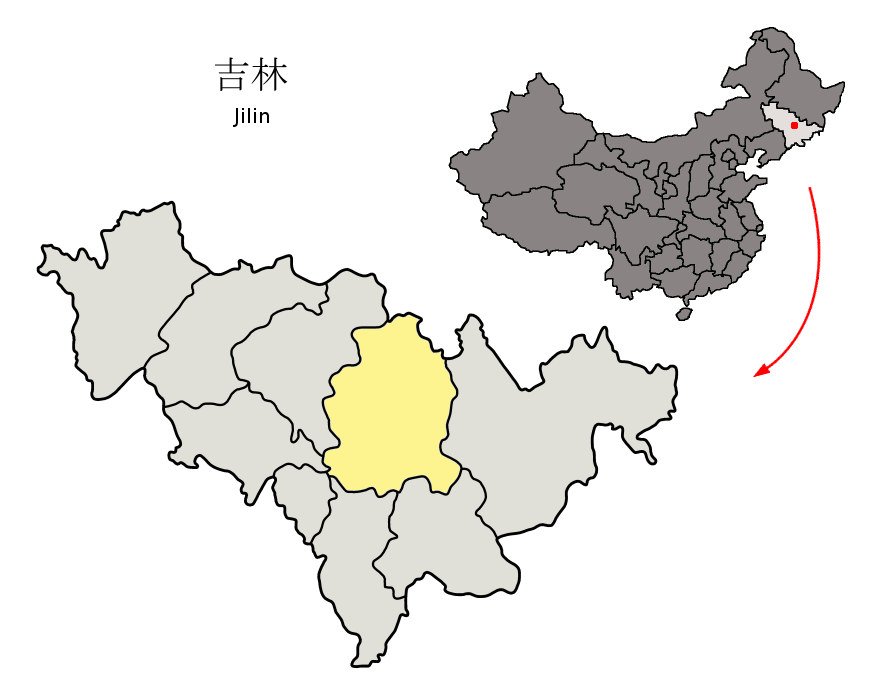
Location of Jilin City in the province

=== Changyi District ===
Subdistricts:

- Hadawan Subdistrict (哈达湾街道), Xinghua Subdistrict (兴华街道), Yanjiang Subdistrict (延江街道), Yan'an Subdistrict (延安街道), Minzhu Subdistrict (民主街道), Tongjiang Subdistrict (通江街道), Wenmiao Subdistrict (文庙街道), Qiachunli Subdistrict (怡春里街道), Weichang Subdistrict (维昌街道), Xindihao Subdistrict (新地号街道), Zhanqian Subdistrict (站前街道), Lianhua Subdistrict (莲花街道), Xinjian Subdistrict (新建街道), Dongjuzi Subdistrict (东局子街道), Shuangji Subdistrict (双吉街道), Jiuzhan Subdistrict (九站街道)

Towns:

- Gudianzi (孤店子镇), Huapichang (桦皮厂镇), Zuojia (左家镇)

Townships:

- Jiuzhan Township (九站乡)

=== Chuanying District ===
Subdistricts:

- Dadong Subdistrict (大东街道), Nanjing Subdistrict (南京街道), Xiangyang Subdistrict (向阳街道), Qingdao Subdistrict (青岛街道), Henan Subdistrict (河南街道), Beiji Subdistrict (北极街道), Zhihe Subdistrict (致和街道), Desheng Subdistrict (德胜街道), Linjiang Subdistrict (临江街道), Changchun Road Subdistrict (长春路街道), Huangqitun Subdistrict (黄旗屯街道), Beishan Subdistrict (北山街道)

Townships:

- Huanxi Township (欢喜乡), Shahezi Township (沙河子乡)

=== Fengman District ===
Subdistricts:

- Shijingou Subdistrict (石井沟街道), Hongqi Subdistrict (红旗街道), Jiangnan Subdistrict (江南街道), Dachangtun Subdistrict (大长屯街道), Gaoxin Subdistrict (高新街道)

The only town is Wangqi (旺起镇)

Townships:

- Fengman Township (丰满乡), Xiaobaishan Township (小白山乡), Qian'erdao Township (前二道乡), Jiangnan Township (江南乡)

=== Longtan District ===
Subdistricts:

- Zunyi Subdistrict (遵义街道), Longtan Subdistrict (龙潭街道), Xin'an Subdistrict (新安街道), Longhua Subdistrict (龙华街道), Hanyang Subdistrict (汉阳街道), Baoziyan Subdistrict (泡子沿街道), Kaoshan Subdistrict (靠山街道), Shanqian Subdistrict (山前街道), New Jilin Subdistrict (新吉林街道), Tuchengzi Subdistrict (土城子街道), Tiedong Subdistrict (铁东街道), Yushu Subdistrict (榆树街道)

The only town is Wulajie Manchu Ethnic Town (乌拉街满族镇)

Townships:

- Jinzhu Township (金珠乡), Jiangbei Township (江北乡), Longtan Township (龙潭乡)

=== Huadian ===
Subdistricts:

- Minghua Subdistrict (明桦街道), Yongji Subdistrict (永吉街道), Shengli Subdistrict (胜利街道), Qixin Subdistrict (启新街道), Xinhua Subdistrict (新华街道)

Towns:

- Hongshi (红石镇), Baishan (白山镇), Jiapigou (夹皮沟镇), Erdaodianzi (二道甸子镇), Badaohezi (八道河子镇), Yumuqiaozi (榆木桥子镇), Laojinchang (老金厂镇), Changshan (常山镇)

Townships:

- Gongji Township (公吉乡), Huajiao Township (桦郊乡), Jinsha Township (金沙乡), Huashulinzi Township (桦树林子乡), Huanan Township (桦南乡), Sumigou Township (苏密沟乡), Beitaizi Township (北台子乡), Hengdaohezi Township (横道河子乡)

=== Jiaohe ===
Subdistricts:

- Henan Subdistrict (河南街道), Naizishan Subdistrict (奶子山街道), Zhonggang Subdistrict (中岗街道), Minzhu Subdistrict (民主街道), Chang'an Subdistrict (长安街道)

Towns:

- Xinzhan (新站镇), Tiangang (天岗镇), Baishishan (白石山镇), Piaohe (漂河镇), Huangsongdian (黄松甸镇), Lafa (拉法镇), Tianbei (天北镇), Songjiang (松江镇), Qingling (庆岭镇)

Townships:

- Nangangzi Township (南岗子乡), Qianjin Township (前进乡), Chishui Township (池水乡), Qingbei Township (青背乡), Xinnong Township (新农乡), Wulin Korean Ethnic Township (乌林朝鲜族乡)

=== Panshi ===
Subdistricts:

- Henan Subdistrict (河南街道), Dongning Subdistrict (东宁街道), Fu'an Subdistrict (福安街道)

Towns:

- Yantongshan (烟筒山镇), Mingcheng (明城镇), Jichang (吉昌镇), Quchaihe (取柴河镇), Yima (驿马镇), Shiju (石咀镇), Futai (富太镇), Hulan (呼兰镇), Hongqiling (红旗岭镇), Songshan (松山镇), Heishi (黑石镇), Niuxin (牛心镇), Chaoyangshan (朝阳山镇)

Townships:

- Baoshan Township (宝山乡)

=== Shulan ===
Subdistricts:

- Beicheng Subdistrict (北城街道), Nancheng Subdistrict (南城街道), Huancheng Subdistrict (环城街道), Jishu Subdistrict (吉舒街道)

Towns:

- Baiqi (白旗镇), Chaoyang (朝阳镇), Shangying (上营镇), Ping'an (平安镇), Shuiquliu (水曲柳镇), Fate (法特镇), Xihe (溪河镇), Xiaocheng (小城镇), Kaiyuan (开原镇), Jinma (金马镇)

Townships:

- Lianhua Township (莲花乡), Liangjiashan Township (亮甲山乡), Xin'an Township (新安乡), Qili Township (七里乡), Tiande Township (天德乡)

=== Yongji County ===
Towns:

- Kouqian (口前镇), Shuanghe (双河镇), Chaluhe (岔路河镇), Xiyang (西阳镇), Wanchang (万昌镇), Beidahu (北大湖镇), Yilaxi (一拉溪镇)

Townships:

- Huangyu Township (黄榆乡), Jinjia Township (金家乡)

== Liaoyuan ==
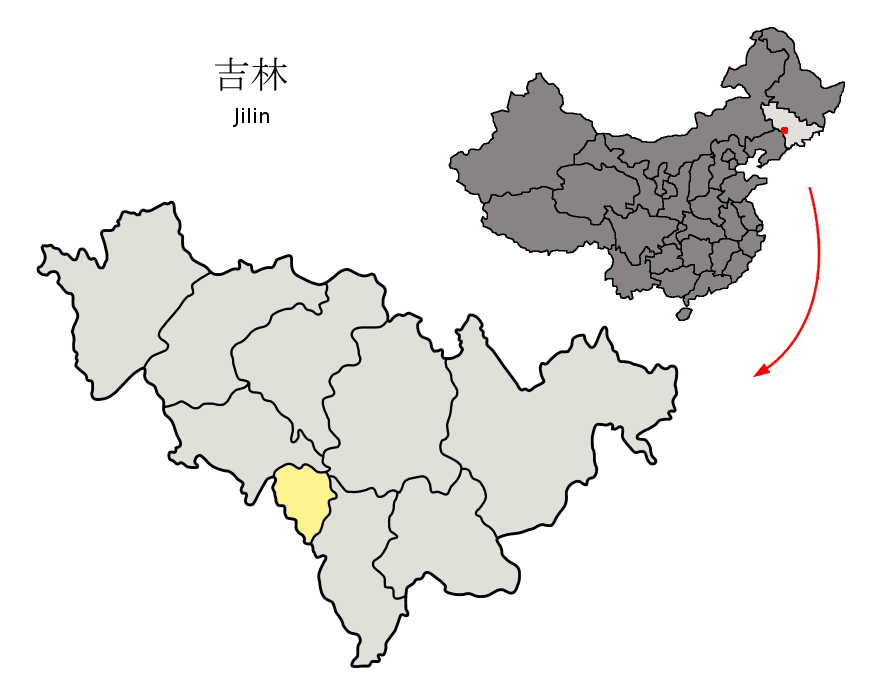
Location of Liaoyuan in the province

=== Longshan District ===
Subdistricts:

- Dongji Subdistrict (东吉街道), Xining Subdistrict (西宁街道), Nankang Subdistrict (南康街道), Beishou Subdistrict (北寿街道), Zhanqian Subdistrict (站前街道), Xiangyang Subdistrict (向阳街道), Fuzhen Subdistrict (福镇街道), Xinxing Subdistrict (新兴街道)

The only town is Shoushan (寿山镇), and the only township is Gongnong Township.

=== Xi'an District ===
Subdistricts:

- Xiancheng Subdistrict (仙城街道), Dongshan Subdistrict (东山街道), Fuguo Subdistrict (富国街道), Xianfeng Subdistrict (先锋街道), Anjia Subdistrict (安家街道), Tai'an Subdistrict (太安街道)

The only township is Dengta Township (灯塔乡)

=== Dongfeng County ===
Towns:

- Dongfeng (东丰镇), Dayang (大阳镇), Hengdaohe (横道河镇), Nadanbo (那丹伯镇), Houshi (猴石镇), Yangmulin (杨木林镇), Xiaosiping (小四平镇), Huanghe (黄河镇), Lalahe (拉拉河镇), Shahe (沙河镇), Nantunji (南屯基镇), Daxing (大兴镇)

Townships:

- Erlongshan Township (二龙山乡), Sanhe Manchu and Korean Ethnic Township (三合满族朝鲜族乡)

=== Dongliao County ===
Towns:

- Baiquan (白泉镇), Liaoheyuan (辽河源镇), Weijin (渭津镇), Anshu (安恕镇), Pinggang (平岗镇), Quantai (泉太镇), Jian'an (建安镇), Anshi (安石镇), Yunshun (云顶镇)

Townships:

- Lingyun Township (凌云乡), Jiashan Township (甲山乡), Zumin Township (足民乡), Jinzhou Township (金州乡)

== Siping ==
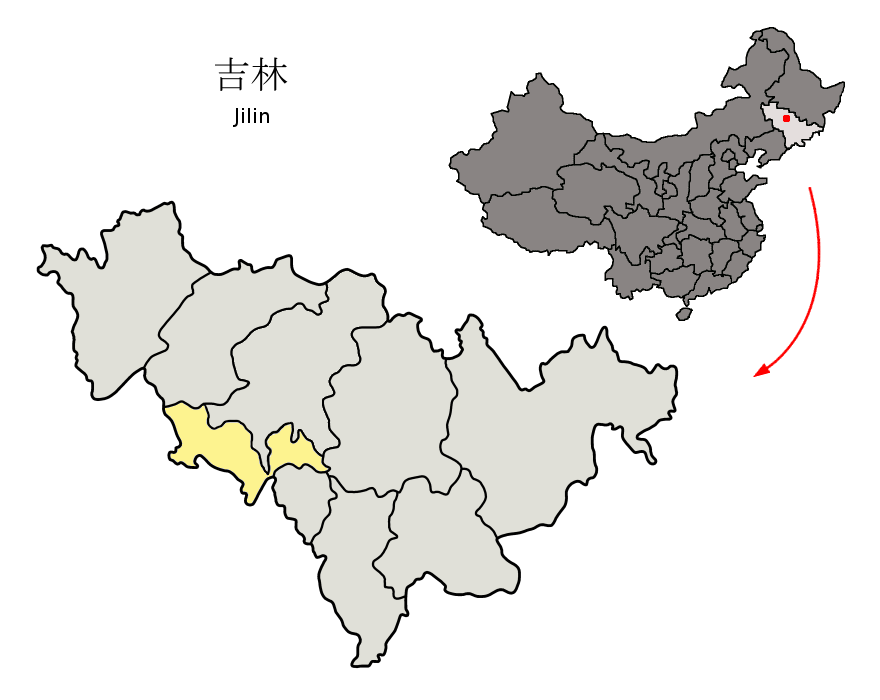
Location of Siping in the province

=== Tiedong District ===
Subdistricts:

- Jiefang Subdistrict (解放街道), Beishichang Subdistrict (北市场街道), Sima Road Subdistrict (四马路街道), Qima Road Subdistrict (七马路街道), Beimen Subdistrict (北门街道), Huangtukang Subdistrict (黄土坑街道), Pingdong Subdistrict (平东街道)

Towns:

- Shanmen (山门镇), Yehe Manchu Ethnic Town (叶赫满族镇)

Townships:

- Changfa Township (长发乡), Chengdong Township (城东乡)

=== Tiexi District ===
Subdistricts:

- Renxing Subdistrict (仁兴街道), Yingxiong Subdistrict (英雄街道), Dizhi Subdistrict (地直街道), Zhanqian Subdistrict (站前街道), Beigou Subdistrict (北沟街道)

Townships:

- Tiaozihe Township (条子河乡), Pingxi Township (平西乡)

=== Gongzhuling ===
Subdistricts:

- Dongsan Subdistrict (东三街道), Tiebei Subdistrict (铁北街道), Tiedong Subdistrict (岭东街道), Henan Subdistrict (河南街道), Hebei Subdistrict (河北街道)

Towns:

- Fanjiatun (范家屯镇), Xiangshui (响水镇), Liufangzi (刘房子镇), Heilinzi (黑林子镇), Daling (大岭镇), Huaide (怀德镇), Shuangchengbao (双城堡镇), Qinjiatun (秦家屯镇), Ershijiazi Manchu Ethnic Town (二十家子满族镇), Sangshutai (桑树台镇), Nanwaizi (南崴子镇), Yangdachengzi (杨大城子镇), Baceng (八屋镇), Taojiatun (陶家屯镇), Bolichengzi (玻璃城子镇), Chaoyangpo (朝阳坡镇), Dayushu (大榆树镇), Maochengzi (毛城子镇), Shiceng (十屋镇)

Townships:

- Shuangyushu Township (双榆树乡), Yulin Township (育林乡), Baoquan Township (宝泉乡), Shuanglong Township (双龙乡), Lianhuashan Township (莲花山乡), Huanling Township (环岭乡), Weizigou Township (苇子沟乡), Liuyang Township (柳杨乡), Yongfa Township (永发乡), Sidaogang Township (四道岗乡), Heqi Township (和气乡), Fengxiang Township (凤响乡), Fangmagou Manchu Ethnic Township (放马沟满族乡)

=== Shuangliao ===
Subdistricts:

- Zhengjiatun Subdistrict (郑家屯街道), Liaodong Subdistrict (辽东街道), Liaonan Subdistrict (辽南街道), Liaoxi Subdistrict (辽西街道), Liaobei Subdistrict (辽北街道), Hongqi Subdistrict (红旗街道)

Towns:

- Maolin (茂林镇), Shuangshan (双山镇), Wohu (卧虎镇), Fuxian (服先镇), Wangben (王奔镇), Bolishan (玻璃山镇), Xinglong (兴隆镇), Dongming (东明镇)

Townships:

- Liutiao Township (柳条乡), Xinli Township (新立乡), Xiangyang Township (向阳乡), Yongjia Township (永加乡), Namusi Mongol Ethnic Township (那木斯蒙古族乡)

=== Lishu County ===
Towns:

- Lishu (梨树镇), Guojiadian (郭家店镇), Yushutai (榆树台镇), Gujiazi (孤家子镇), Xiaochengzi (小城子镇), Caijia (蔡家镇), Mengjialing (孟家岭镇), Shijiabao (十家堡镇), Lamadian (喇嘛甸镇), Liujiaguanzi (刘家馆子镇), Wanfa (万发镇), Donghe (东河镇), Taiping (太平镇), Shenyang (沈洋镇), Sanjiazi (三家子镇), Linhai (林海镇), Xiaokuan (小宽镇)

Townships:

- Baishan Township (白山乡), Shengli Township (胜利乡), Quanyanling Township (泉眼岭乡), Jinshan Township (金山乡), Shuanghe Township (双河乡), Sikeshu Township (四棵树乡)

=== Yitong Manchu Autonomous County ===
Towns:

- Yitong (伊通镇), Yingchengzi (营城子镇), *Kaoshan (靠山镇), Dagushan (大孤山镇), Xiaogushan (小孤山镇), Yidan (伊丹镇), Jingtai (景台镇), Xiwei (西苇镇), Erdao (二道镇), Heyuan (河源镇), Huanglingzi (黄岭子镇), Ma'an (马鞍镇)

Townships:

- Sandao Township (三道乡), Xinxing Township (新兴乡), Moliqing Township (莫里青乡)

== Songyuan ==
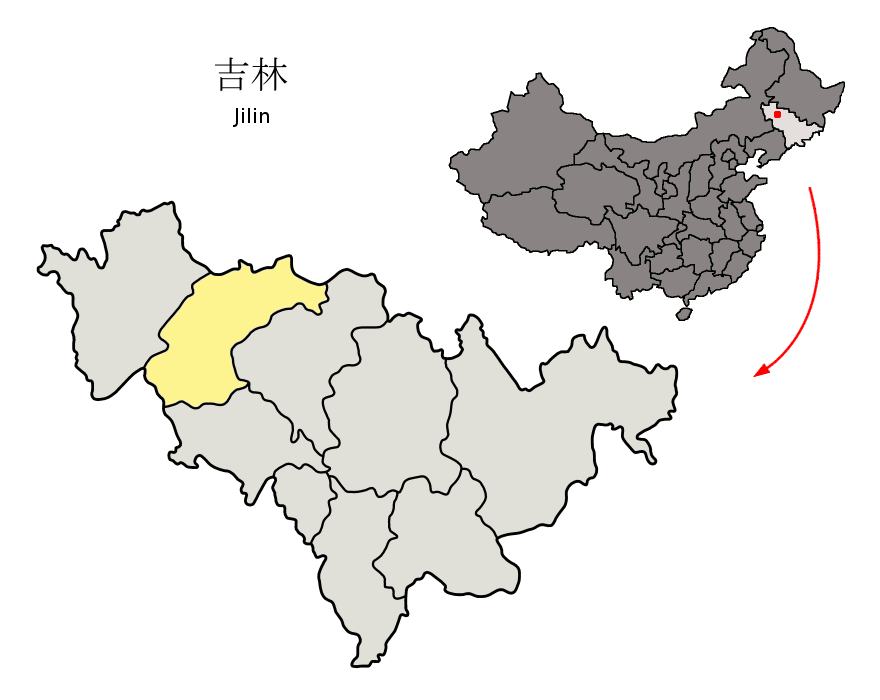
Location of Songyuan in the province

=== Ningjiang District ===
Subdistricts:

- Wenhua Subdistrict (文化街道), Linjiang Subdistrict (临江街道), Gongnong Subdistrict (工农街道), Tuanjie Subdistrict (团结街道), Minzhu Subdistrict (民主街道), Qianjin Subdistrict (前进街道), Heping Road Subdistrict (和平路街道), Shihua Subdistrict (石化街道), Yanjiang Subdistrict (沿江街道), Fanrong Subdistrict (繁荣街道)

Towns:

- Dawa (大洼镇), Maoduzhan (毛都站镇)

Townships:

- Chaoyang Township (朝阳乡), Xincheng Township (新城乡), Xingyuan Township (兴原乡), Gaiyou Township (善友乡), Bodu Township (伯都乡), Fenghua Township (风华乡), Xinmin Township (新民乡)

=== Changling County ===
Towns:

- Changling (长岭镇), Taipingchuan (太平川镇), Jubao (巨宝镇), Taipingshan (太平山镇), Qianqihao (前七号镇), Xin'an (新安镇), Sanqingshan (三青山镇), Daxing (大兴镇), Beizheng (北正镇), Yongjiu (永久镇), Liushui (流水镇), Lifasheng (利发盛镇)

Townships:

- Sanshihao Township (三十号乡), Jiti Township (集体乡), Guangming Township (光明乡), Sanxianbao Township (三县堡乡), Haiqing Township (海青乡), Qianjin Township (前进乡), Dongling Township (东岭乡), Santuan Township (三团乡), Bashiba Township (八十八乡), Yaotuozi Township (腰坨子乡)

=== Fuyu County ===
Towns:

- Sanchahe (三岔河镇), Wujiadian (五家站镇), Sanjingzi (三井子镇), Caijiagou (蔡家沟镇), Gongpengzi (弓棚子镇), Zengsheng (增盛镇), Changchunling (长春岭镇), Taolaizhao (陶赖昭镇), Xinwanfa (新万发镇)

Townships:

- Sanyi Township (三义乡), Yongping Township (永平乡), Xiaojia Township (肖家乡), Erlongshan Township (二龙山乡), Shiqiao Township (石桥乡), Yijiadian Township (伊家店乡), Xujiadian Township (徐家店乡), Gengxin Township (更新乡), Dalinzi Township (大林子乡), Xinzhan Township (新站乡), Simajia Township (四马架乡), Sheli Township (社里乡), Xinchengju Township (新城局乡), Dasanjiazi Township (大三家子乡), Yushugou Township (榆树沟乡), Qijiazi Township (七家子乡), Lalin Township (拉林乡)

=== Qian'an County ===
Towns:

- Qian'an (乾安镇), Dabusu (大布苏镇), Shuizi (水字镇), Suozi (所字镇), Anzi (安字镇), Rangzi (让字镇)

Townships:

- Yuzi Township (余字乡), Zanzi Township (赞字乡), Daozi Township (道字乡), Yanzi Township (严字乡)

=== Qian Gorlos Mongol Autonomous County ===
Towns:

- Qian Gorlos Town (前郭尔罗斯镇), Changshan (长山镇), Haiborige (海渤日戈镇), Wulantuga (乌兰图嘎镇), Chaganhua (查干花镇), Wangfuzhan (王府站镇), Balang Township, Halamaodu (哈拉毛都镇)

Townships:

- Baodian Township (宝甸乡), Pingfeng Township (平凤乡), Menggu'aili Township (蒙古艾里乡), Daliba Township (达里巴乡), Jilatu Township (吉拉吐乡), Baiyilaga Township (白依拉嘎乡), Hongquan Township (洪泉乡), Eru Township (额如乡), Taohaotai Township (套浩太乡), Changlong Township (长龙乡), Wulantala Township (乌兰塔拉乡), Dongsanjiazi Township (东三家子乡), Haotemangha Township (浩特芒哈乡), Wulan'aodu Township (乌兰敖都乡)

== Tonghua ==
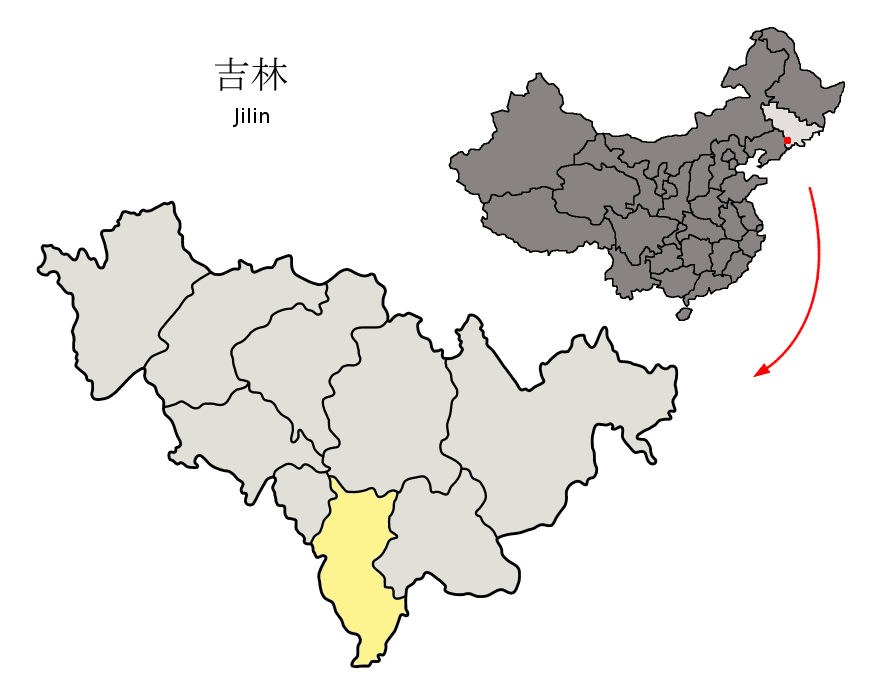
Location of Tonghua in the province

=== Dongchang District ===
Subdistricts:

- Guangming Subdistrict (光明街道), Minzhu Subdistrict (民主街道), Dongchang Subdistrict (东昌街道), Longquan Subdistrict (龙泉街道), Xinzhan Subdistrict (新站街道), Laozhan Subdistrict (老站街道), Tuanjie Subdistrict (团结街道)

The only town is Jinchang (金厂镇)

Townships:

- Jiangdong Township (江东乡), Huantong Township (环通乡)

=== Erdaojiang District ===
Subdistricts:

- East Tonghua Subdistrict (东通化街道), Taoyuan Subdistrict (桃园街道)

Towns:

- Wudaojiang (五道江镇), Tiechang (铁厂镇), Yayuan (鸭园镇)

The only township is Erdaojiang Township (二道江乡)

=== Meihekou ===
Subdistricts:

- Xinhua Subdistrict (新华街道), Jiefang Subdistrict (解放街道), Guangming Subdistrict (光明街道), Heping Subdistrict (和平街道), Fumin Subdistrict

Towns:

- Shancheng (山城镇), Hailong (海龙镇), Hongmei (红梅镇), Jinhua (进化镇), Xinhe (新合镇), Shuguang (曙光镇), Zhonghe (中和镇), Yizuoying (一座营镇), Shuidao (水道镇), Yezhuhe (野猪河镇), Kangdaying (康大营镇), Heishantou (黑山头镇), Niuxinding (牛心顶镇), Dawan (大湾镇), Shuangxing (双兴镇), Xinghua (兴华镇)

Townships:

- Lilu Township (李炉乡), Shuangquan Township (双泉乡), Sibashi Township (四八石乡), Chengnan Township (城南乡), Yimin Township (义民乡), Xingling Township (杏岭乡), Jile Township (吉乐乡), Jiangjiajie Township (姜家街乡), Wanlong Township (湾龙乡), Xiaoyang Manchu and Korean Ethnic Township (小杨满族朝鲜族乡), Huayuan Korean Ethnic Township (花园朝鲜族乡)

=== Ji'an ===
Subdistricts:

- Tuanjie Subdistrict (团结街道), Liming Subdistrict (黎明街道), Chengdong Subdistrict (城东街道), Tongsheng Subdistrict (通胜街道)

Towns:

- Qingshi (青石镇), Qinghe (清河镇), Toudao (头道镇), Huadian (花甸镇), Yulin (榆林镇), Taishang (台上镇), Caiyuan (财源镇), Yangcha (阳岔镇), Dalu (大路镇), Renao (热闹镇)

Townships:

- Taiwang Township (太王乡), Maxian Township (麻线乡), Huangbai Township (黄柏乡), Taiping Township (太平乡), Tonggou Township (通沟乡), Shuangcha Township (双岔乡), Guoshuchang Township (果树场乡), Liangshui Korean Ethnic Township (凉水朝鲜族乡)

=== Huinan County ===
Towns:

- Chaoyang (朝阳镇), Yangzishao (样子哨镇), Shansonggang (杉松岗镇), Jinchuan (金川镇), Shidaohe (石道河镇), Huifacheng (辉发城镇), Huinan (辉南镇), Qingyang (庆阳镇), Fumin (抚民镇), Tuanlin (团林镇)

The only township is Loujie Korean Ethnic Township (楼街朝鲜族乡)

=== Liuhe County ===
Towns:

- Liuhe (柳河镇), Gushanzi (孤山子镇), Wudaogou (五道沟镇), Tuoyaoling (驼腰岭镇), Sanyuanpu Korean Town (三源浦朝鲜族镇), Shengshui (圣水镇), Liangshuihezi (凉水河子镇), Luotongshan (罗通山镇), Ankou (安口镇), Xiangyang (向阳镇), Hongshi (红石镇), Hengtong

Townships:

- Shijiadian Township (时家店乡), Liunan Township (柳南乡), Jiangjiadian Korean Ethnic Township (姜家店朝鲜族乡)

=== Tonghua County ===
Towns:

- Kuaidamao (快大茂镇), Guosong (果松镇), Ermi (二密镇), Ying'ebu (英额布镇), Xinglin (兴林镇), Sankeyushu (三棵榆树镇), Jiangdian (江甸镇), Shihu (石湖镇), Guanghua (光华镇), Da'an (大安镇)

Townships:

- Fujiang Township (富江乡), Donglai Township (东来乡), Sipeng Township (四棚乡), Daquanyuan Manchu and Korean Ethnic Township (大泉源满族朝鲜族乡, 대천위 만주족 조선족 향), Jindou Korean and Manchu Ethnic Township (金斗朝鲜族满族乡, 김두 조선족 만주족 향)

== Yanbian Korean Autonomous Prefecture ==
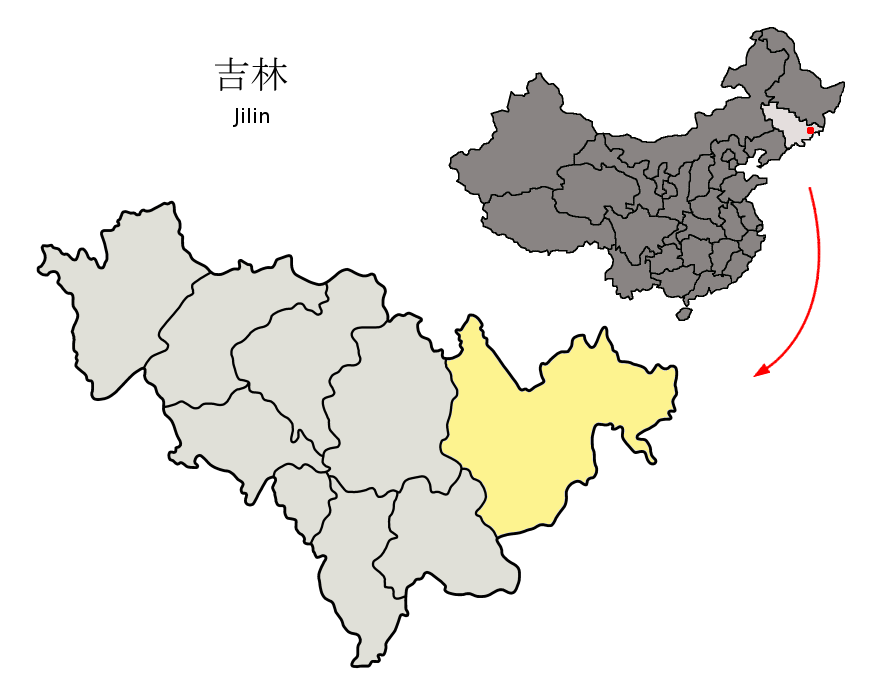
Location of Yanbian in the province

=== Dunhua ===
Subdistricts:

- Minzhu Subdistrict (民主街道 / 민주가도), Bohai Subdistrict (渤海街道 / 발해가도), Shengli Subdistrict (胜利街道 / 승리가도), Danjiang Subdistrict (丹江街道 / 단강가도)

Towns:

- Dashitou, Huangnihe (黄泥河镇 / 황니하진), Guandi (官地镇 / 관지진), Shaheyan (沙河沿镇 / 사하연진), Qiuligou (秋梨沟镇 / 추리구진), Aegmog (额穆镇 / 액목진), Xianru (贤儒镇 / 현유진), Dapuchaihe (大蒲柴河镇 / 대포채하진), Yanminghu (雁鸣湖镇 / 안명호진), Jiangyuan (江源镇 / 강원진), Jiangnan (江南镇 / 강남진)

Townships:

- Daqiao Township, Heishi Township (黑石乡 / 흑석향), Qinggouzi Township (青沟子乡 / 청구자향), Hanzhang Township (翰章乡 / 한장향), Hongshi Township (红石乡 / 홍석향)

=== Helong ===
Subdistricts:

- Wenhua Subdistrict (文化街道 / 문화가도), Minhui Subdistrict (民惠街道 / 민혜가도), Guangming Subdistrict (光明街道 / 광명가도)

Towns:

- Toudao (头道镇 / 두도진), Bajiazi (八家子镇 / 팔가자진), Fudong (福洞镇 / 복동진), Xicheng (西城镇 / 서성진), Nanping (南坪镇 / 남평진), Longcheng (龙城镇 / 용성진), Dongcheng (东城镇 / 동성진), Chongshan (崇善镇 / 숭선진)

=== Hunchun ===
Subdistricts:

- Xin'an Subdistrict (新安街道 / 신안가도), Jinghe Subdistrict (靖和街道 / 정화가도), Henan Subdistrict (河南街道 / 하남가도), Jinhai Subdistrict (近海街道 / 근해가도)

Towns:

- Chunhua (春化镇 / 춘화진), Jingxin (敬信镇 / 경신진), Banshi (板石镇 / 판석진), Ying'an (英安镇 / 영안진)

Townships:

- Hadamen Township (哈达门乡 / 합달문향), Machuanzi Township (马川子乡 / 마천자향), Mihong Township (密江乡 / 밀강향), Sanjiazi Manchu Ethnic Township (三家子满族乡 / 삼가자 만주족 향), Yangbaozi Manchu Ethnic Township (杨泡子满族乡 / 양포자 만주족 향)

=== Longjing ===
Subdistricts:

- Anmin Subdistrict (安民街道 / 안민 가도), Longmen Subdistrict (龙门街道 / 용문가도)

Towns:

- Chaoyangchuan (朝阳川镇 / 조양천진), Kaishantun (开山屯镇 / 개산둔진), Laotougou (老头沟镇 / 노두구진), Sanhe (三合镇 / 삼합진), Dongshengyong (东盛涌镇 / 동성용진), Zhixin (智新镇 / 지신진)

Townships:

- Dexin Township (德新乡 / 덕산향), Baijin Township (白金乡 / 백금향)

=== Tumen ===
Subdistricts:

- Xiangshang Subdistrict (向上街道 / 향상가도), Xinhua Subdistrict (新华街道 / 신화가도), Yuegong Subdistrict (月宫街道 / 월궁가도)

Towns:

- Yuejing (月晴镇 / 월청진), Shixian (石峴镇 / 석현진), Chang'an (长安镇 / 장안진), Liangshui (凉水镇 / 양수진)

=== Yanji ===
Subdistricts:

- Henan Subdistrict (河南街道 / 하남가도), Jiangong Subdistrict (建工街道 / 건공가도), Xinxing Subdistrict (新兴街道 / 신흥가도), Gongyuan Subdistrict (公园街道 / 공원가도), Chaoyang Subdistrict (朝阳街道 / 조양가도), Beishan Subdistrict (北山街道 / 북산가도)

Towns:

- Yilan (依兰镇 / 이란진), Sandaowan (三道湾镇 / 삼도만진), Xiaoying (小营镇 / 소영진)

=== Antu County ===
Towns:

- Mingyue (明月镇 / 명월진), Songjiang (松江镇 / 송강진), Erdaobaihe (二道白河镇 / 이도백하진), Liangjiang (两江镇 / 량강진), Shimen (石门镇 / 석문진), Wanbao (万宝镇 / 만보진), Liangbing (亮兵镇 / 량병진)

Townships:

- Xinhe Township (新合乡 / 신합향), Yongqing Township (永庆乡 / 영경향)

=== Wangqing County ===
Towns:

- Wangqing (汪清镇 / 왕청진), Daxinggou (大兴沟镇 / 대흥구진), Tianqiaoling (天桥岭镇 / 천교령진), Luozigou (罗子沟镇 / 라자구진), Chunyang (春阳镇 / 춘양진), Fuxing (复兴镇 / 복흥진), Baicaogou (百草沟镇 / 백초구진), Dongguang (东光镇 / 동광진)

The only township is Jiguan Township (鸡冠乡 / 계관향)
