= Xinghua =

Xinghua, the Mandarin Chinese pinyin transliteration of three similarly pronounced names ("兴华"; Xīnghuá, "兴化"; Xīnghuà and "杏花"; Xìnghuā; 'apricot blossom'), may refer to:

- Xinghua, Jiangsu (兴化市), a county-level city in Jiangsu
- Xinghua Prefecture (興化郡), a historical prefecture in modern day Putian, Fujian
- Xinghua Bay (兴化湾), the inlet beside Putian in Fujian, named for the former prefecture

== Subdistricts ==
There are numerous subdistricts referred to as Xinghua Subdistrict, often with the identical Chinese name "兴华街道":

- Xinghua Subdistrict, Guangzhou, in Tianhe District, Guangzhou, Guangdong
- Xinghua Subdistrict, Qitaihe, in Xinxing District, Qitaihe, Heilongjiang
- Xinghua Subdistrict, Manzhouli, in Manzhouli, Hulunbuir, Inner Mongolia
- Xinghua Subdistrict, Zhalantun, in Zhalantun, Hulunbuir, Inner Mongolia
- Xinghua Subdistrict, Jilin City, in Changyi District, Jilin City, Jilin
- Xinghua Subdistrict, Shenyang, in Tiexi District, Shenyang, Liaoning
- Xinghua Subdistrict, Taiyuan, in Wanbailin District, Taiyuan, Shanxi
- Xinghua Subdistrict, Daqing (兴化街道), in Longfeng District, Daqing, Heilongjiang
- Xinghua Subdistrict, Jixi (杏花街道), in Chengzihe District, Jixi, Heilongjiang

== Towns ==
There are numerous towns referred to as Xinghua, often with the identical Chinese name "兴华镇":

- Xinghua, Qinggang County, in Qinggang County, Heilongjiang
- Xinghua, Henan, in Luoning County, Henan
- Xinghua, Meihekou, in Meihekou, Jilin
- Xinghua, Fengkai County (杏花镇), in Fengkai County, Guangdong

== Townships ==
- Xinghua Township, Liangdang County (兴化乡), in Liangdang County, Gansu
- Xinghua Township, Tanchang County (兴化乡), in Tanchang County, Gansu
- Xinghua Shui Ethnic Township (兴华水族乡), in Rongjiang County, Guizhou
- Xinghua Township, Baiquan County (兴华乡), in Baiquan County, Heilongjiang
- Xinghua Township, Huma County (兴华乡), in Huma County, Heilongjiang
- Xinghua Township, Hubei (杏花乡), in Hong'an County, Hubei

== See also ==
- Xinghua Campaign of the Chinese Civil War
- Xinghua Road (disambiguation)
- Putian people, also known as Xinghua people
- Xinhua (disambiguation)
