= Shihua =

Shihua could refer to the following locations in China:

- Shihua, Hubei (石花镇), town in Gucheng County, Xiangyang, Hubei

Written as "石化":

- Shihua Subdistrict, Handan, in Fuxing District, Handan, Hebei
- Shihua Subdistrict, Songyuan, in Ningjiang District, Songyuan, Jilin
- Shihua Subdistrict, Shanghai, in Jinshan District
- Shihua Subdistrict, Ürümqi, in Midong District, Ürümqi, Xinjiang
- Shihua Road Subdistrict, Daguan District, Anqing, Anhui

== See also ==
- Shihua (poetry talks)
