= Shuanggang =

Shuanggang may refer to the following locations in China:

- Shuanggang, Anqing (双港镇), town in Tongcheng, Anhui
- Shuanggang, Jiangsu (双港镇), town in Xiangshui County
- Shuanggang, Jiangxi (双港镇), town in Poyang County
- Shuanggang, Jilin (双岗镇), town in Tongyu County
- Shuanggang, Tianjin (双港镇), town in Jinnan District
- Shuanggang Subdistrict, Hefei (双岗街道), in Luyang District
- Shuanggang Subdistrict, Quzhou (双港街道), in Kecheng District, Quzhou, Zhejiang
- Shuanggang, Wudian, a village in Wudian, Guangshui, Suizhou, Hubei
