= Tongjiang =

Tongjiang may refer to the following locations in China:

- Tongjiang, Heilongjiang (同江市), county-level city of Jiamusi, Heilongjiang
  - Tongjiang, Tongjiang, Heilongjiang (同江镇), town in and seat of Tongjiang, Heilongjiang
- Tongjiang County (通江县), Sichuan

Subdistricts (通江街道)

- Tongjiang Subdistrict, Harbin, in Daoli District
- Tongjiang Subdistrict, Nehe, Heilongjiang
- Tongjiang Subdistrict, Wuxi, in Chong'an District, Wuxi, Jiangsu
- Tongjiang Subdistrict, Jilin City, in Changyi District, Jilin City, Jilin

Other divisions

- Tongjiang, Wangkui County (通江镇), Heilongjiang
- Tongjiang Township (通江乡), Fuyuan County, Heilongjiang
