= Pingtai =

Pingtai (平台) may refer to the following locations in China:

- Pingtai, Guangdong, town in Yunan County
- Pingtai, Jilin, town in Taobei District, Baicheng
  - Pingtai Railway Station (平台站), postal code 137002, station on the Baicheng–Arxan Railway in Baicheng, Jilin
- Pingtai Subdistrict, Liangyuan District, Shangqiu, Henan
