= Zhihe =

Zhihe may refer to:

== Places in China ==
- Zhihe, Shanxi (芝河), a town in Yonghe County, Shanxi
- Zhihe Subdistrict, Jilin (致和街道), Jilin
- Zhihe Subdistrict, Pengzhou (致和街道), Sichuan

== Historical eras ==
- Zhihe (至和, 1054–1056), era name used by Emperor Renzong of Song
- Zhihe (致和, 1328), era name used by Yesün Temür (Yuan dynasty)
