= Changling County =

Changling County 长岭县
- County
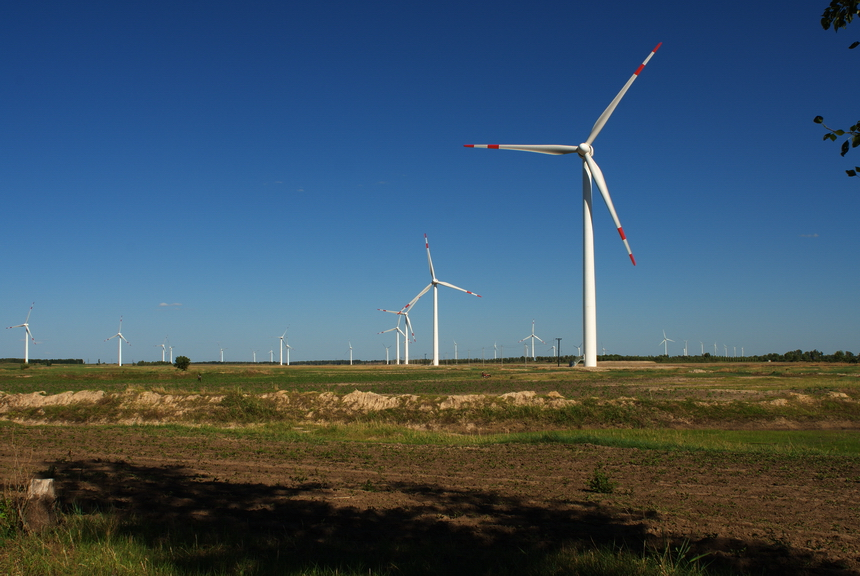

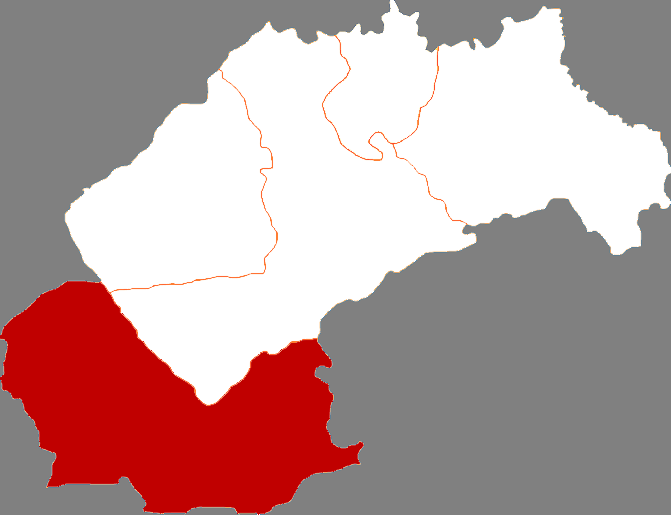
- Changling in Songyuan

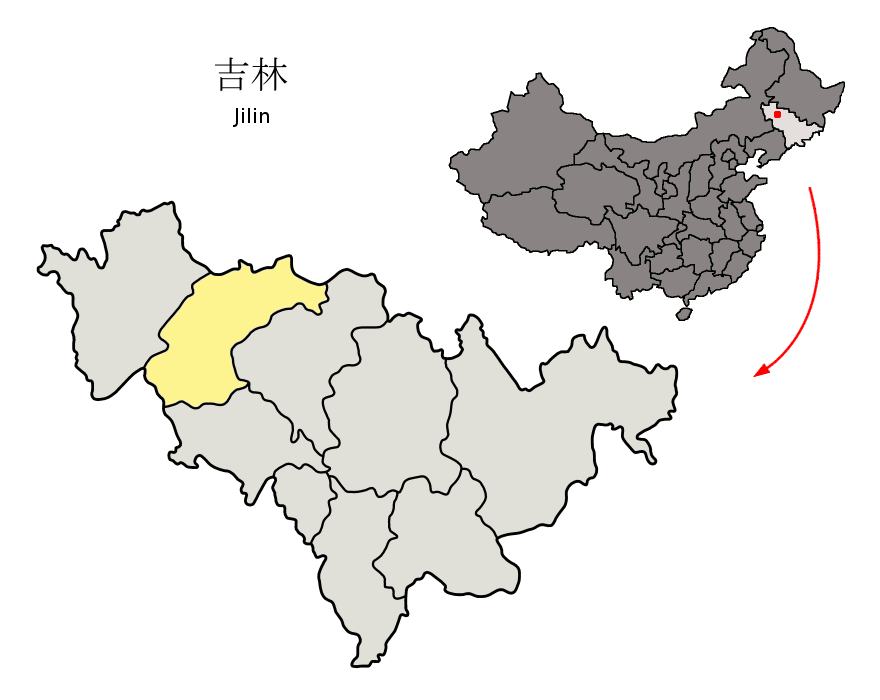
- Songyuan in Jilin
- Coordinates: 44°16′34″N 123°58′01″E
- Country: People's Republic of China
- Province: Jilin
- Prefecture-level city: Songyuan
- Seat: Changling Town (长岭镇)

Area
  - Total: 5,787 km^{2} (2,234 sq mi)
- Elevation: 191 m (627 ft)

Population
  - Total: 640,000
  - Density: 110/km^{2} (290/sq mi)
- Time zone: UTC+8 (China Standard)
- Postal code: 131500

Changling County (simplified Chinese: 长岭县; traditional Chinese: 長嶺縣; pinyin: Chánglǐng Xiàn) is a county in the northwest of Jilin province, China, bordering Inner Mongolia to the west. It is the southernmost and westernmost county-level division of the prefecture-level city of Songyuan, with a population of 640,000 residing in an area of 5,787 km^{2} (2,234 sq mi).

== Administrative divisions ==
The county administers 12 towns and 10 townships.

Towns:

- Changling (长岭镇)
- Taipingchuan (太平川镇)
- Jubao (巨宝镇)
- Taipingshan (太平山镇)
- Qianqihao (前七号镇)
- Xin'an (新安镇)
- Sanqingshan (三青山镇)
- Daxing (大兴镇)
- Beizheng (北正镇)
- Yongjiu (永久镇)
- Liushui (流水镇)
- Lifasheng (利发盛镇)

Townships:

- Sanshihao Township (三十号乡)
- Jiti Township (集体乡)
- Guangming Township (光明乡)
- Sanxianbao Township (三县堡乡)
- Haiqing Township (海青乡)
- Qianjin Township (前进乡)
- Dongling Township (东岭乡)
- Santuan Township (三团乡)
- Bashiba Township (八十八乡)
- Yaotuozi Township (腰坨子乡)

== Geography and climate ==
Changling is in the southwest part of Songyuan City and borders Nong'an County to the east, Gongzhuling and Shuangliao to the south, Horqin Left Middle Banner of Inner Mongolia to the west, and Tongyu County, Qian'an County, and Qian Gorlos County to the north.

Changling has a monsoon-influenced humid continental climate (Köppen Dwa) characterised by hot, humid summers, due to the monsoon, and long, very cold and dry winters, due to the Siberian anticyclone. A majority of the annual rainfall occurs in July and August. The monthly 24-hour average temperatures ranges from −15.2 °C (4.6 °F) in January to 23.6 °C (74.5 °F) in July, while the annual mean is 6.0 °C (42.8 °F). The frost-free period lasts 140 days.

Climate data for Changling, elevation 189 m (620 ft),(1991–2020 normals, extremes 1971–2010)
Month	Jan	Feb	Mar	Apr	May	Jun	Jul	Aug	Sep	Oct	Nov	Dec	Year
Record high °C (°F)	5.0 (41.0)	14.9 (58.8)	21.3 (70.3)	31.3 (88.3)	35.7 (96.3)	37.6 (99.7)	36.4 (97.5)	36.2 (97.2)	32.3 (90.1)	27.1 (80.8)	19.3 (66.7)	10.6 (51.1)	37.6 (99.7)
Mean daily maximum °C (°F)	−9.0 (15.8)	−3.3 (26.1)	5.0 (41.0)	15.1 (59.2)	22.5 (72.5)	27.3 (81.1)	28.8 (83.8)	27.4 (81.3)	22.7 (72.9)	13.8 (56.8)	1.9 (35.4)	−7.2 (19.0)	12.1 (53.7)
Daily mean °C (°F)	−14.8 (5.4)	−9.6 (14.7)	−1.2 (29.8)	8.8 (47.8)	16.4 (61.5)	21.8 (71.2)	24.1 (75.4)	22.4 (72.3)	16.5 (61.7)	7.7 (45.9)	−3.5 (25.7)	−12.5 (9.5)	6.3 (43.4)
Mean daily minimum °C (°F)	−19.5 (−3.1)	−15.0 (5.0)	−6.8 (19.8)	2.6 (36.7)	10.4 (50.7)	16.5 (61.7)	19.8 (67.6)	17.9 (64.2)	10.9 (51.6)	2.4 (36.3)	−8.0 (17.6)	−16.9 (1.6)	1.2 (34.1)
Record low °C (°F)	−34.9 (−30.8)	−34.3 (−29.7)	−24.2 (−11.6)	−12.0 (10.4)	−4.3 (24.3)	4.4 (39.9)	10.0 (50.0)	7.7 (45.9)	−1.2 (29.8)	−13.5 (7.7)	−24.9 (−12.8)	−33.0 (−27.4)	−34.9 (−30.8)
Average precipitation mm (inches)	2.5 (0.10)	2.9 (0.11)	8.6 (0.34)	13.9 (0.55)	46.1 (1.81)	75.1 (2.96)	102.8 (4.05)	97.5 (3.84)	38.3 (1.51)	21.6 (0.85)	9.3 (0.37)	4.2 (0.17)	422.8 (16.66)
Average precipitation days (≥ 0.1 mm)	3.2	2.3	3.7	4.5	8.7	11.6	11.7	10.4	7.4	5.0	3.7	4.1	76.3
Average snowy days	4.5	3.6	4.9	1.5	0	0	0	0	0.1	1.1	3.9	5.7	25.3
Average relative humidity (%)	63	54	47	42	48	61	73	74	64	57	59	64	59
Mean monthly sunshine hours	186.1	201.3	238.1	234.0	253.1	244.0	225.9	222.8	237.2	215.2	171.3	162.1	2,591.1
Percentage possible sunshine	65	68	64	58	55	53	49	52	64	64	60	59	59
Source 1: China Meteorological Administration
Source 2: Weather China
