= Huayuankou =

Huayuankou (simplified Chinese: 花园口; traditional Chinese: 花園口; pinyin: Huāyuánkǒu) may refer to these towns in China:

- Huayuankou, Henan, in Zhengzhou, Henan
- Huayuankou, Jilin, in Jingyu County, Jilin
