= Henan Subdistrict, Panshi =

Henan Subdistrict 河南街道
- Subdistrict
- Location in Jilin
- Coordinates: 42°56′35″N 126°5′7″E
- Country: People's Republic of China
- Province: Jilin
- Prefecture-level city: Jilin City
- County-level city: Panshi
- Time zone: UTC+8 (China Standard)

Henan Subdistrict (Chinese: 河南街道; pinyin: Hénán Jiēdào) is a subdistrict in Panshi, Jilin province, China. As of 2018, it has four communities under its administration.

== See also ==
- List of township-level divisions of Jilin
