= Shuangyang, Changchun =

Shuangyang 双阳区
- District
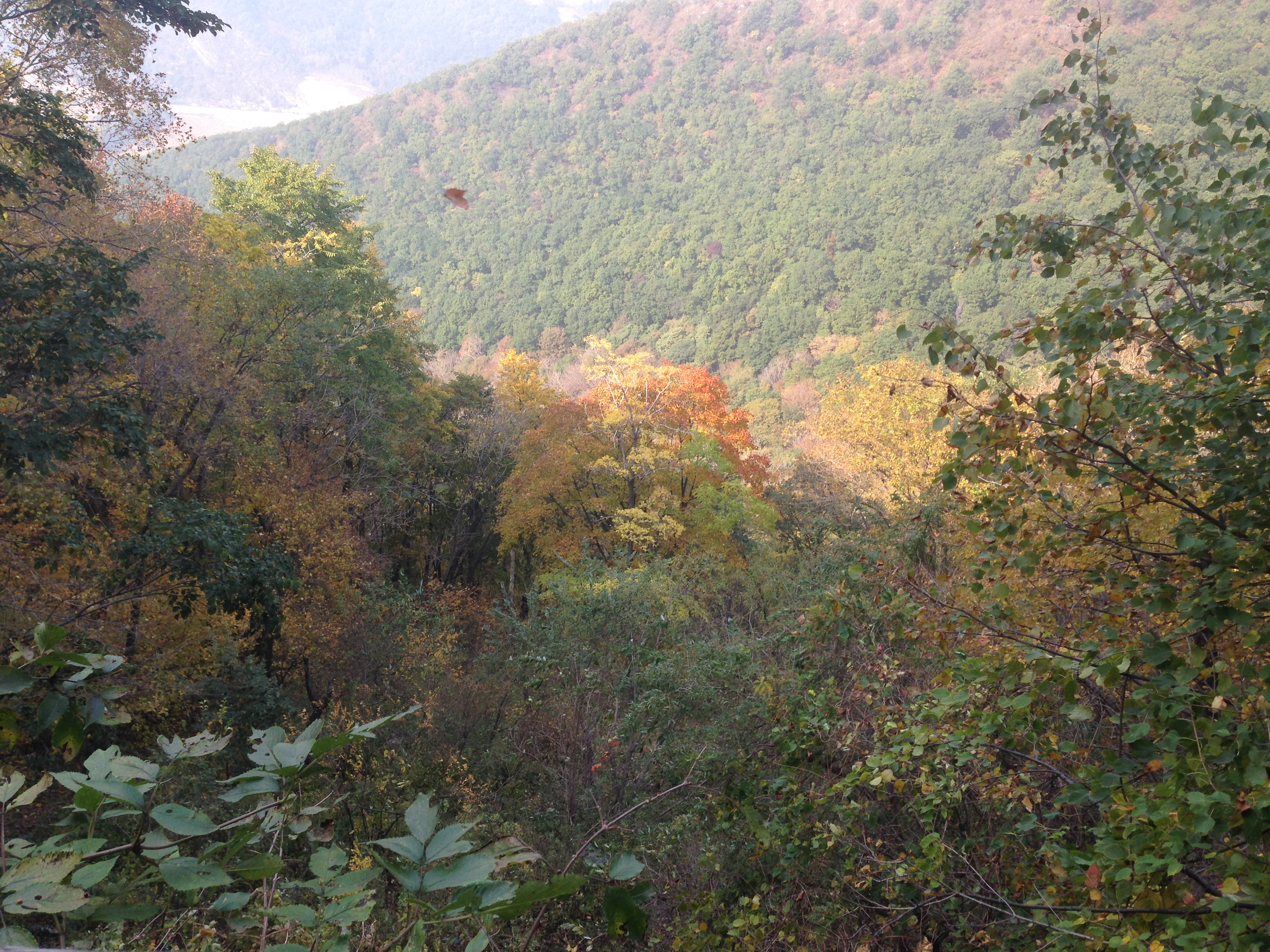

- Location in Jilin
- Coordinates: 43°31′30″N 125°40′08″E
- Country: People's Republic of China
- Province: Jilin
- Sub-provincial city: Changchun

Area
  - Total: 1,677 km^{2} (647 sq mi)

Population (2010)
  - Total: 377,803
  - Density: 225.3/km^{2} (583.5/sq mi)
- Time zone: UTC+8 (China Standard)
- Postal code: 1306XX

Shuangyang District (simplified Chinese: 双阳区; traditional Chinese: 雙陽區; pinyin: Shuāngyáng Qū) is one of seven districts of the prefecture-level city of Changchun, the capital of Jilin Province, Northeast China, forming part of the city's southeastern suburbs. Despite its name, it lies more than 40 kilometres (25 mi) southeast of the urban centre. It borders the districts of Erdao to the north and Nanguan to the northwest, as well as the prefecture-level cities of Jilin to the south and east and Siping to the southwest.

== Administrative divisions ==
There are four subdistricts, four towns, and one ethnic township.

Subdistricts:

- Pinghu Subdistrict (平湖街道), Yunshan Subdistrict (云山街道), Sheling Subdistrict (奢岭街道), Shanhe Subdistrict (山河街道)

Towns:

- Taiping (太平镇), Luxiang (鹿乡镇), Tuding (土顶镇), Qijia (齐家镇)

The only township is Shuangyingzi Hui Ethnic Township (双营子回族乡)

== Climate ==
Climate data for Shuangyang, elevation 220 m (720 ft), (1991–2020 normals, extremes 1981–2010)
Month	Jan	Feb	Mar	Apr	May	Jun	Jul	Aug	Sep	Oct	Nov	Dec	Year
Record high °C (°F)	5.4 (41.7)	13.7 (56.7)	21.6 (70.9)	31.2 (88.2)	35.3 (95.5)	37.9 (100.2)	36.9 (98.4)	35.3 (95.5)	30.6 (87.1)	28.1 (82.6)	21.8 (71.2)	12.6 (54.7)	37.9 (100.2)
Mean daily maximum °C (°F)	−8.8 (16.2)	−3.5 (25.7)	4.6 (40.3)	14.9 (58.8)	22.2 (72.0)	26.7 (80.1)	28.2 (82.8)	27.0 (80.6)	22.5 (72.5)	14.0 (57.2)	2.5 (36.5)	−6.5 (20.3)	12.0 (53.6)
Daily mean °C (°F)	−15.4 (4.3)	−10.2 (13.6)	−1.3 (29.7)	8.5 (47.3)	15.9 (60.6)	21.1 (70.0)	23.4 (74.1)	21.9 (71.4)	15.7 (60.3)	7.4 (45.3)	−3.0 (26.6)	−12.3 (9.9)	6.0 (42.8)
Mean daily minimum °C (°F)	−20.9 (−5.6)	−16.3 (2.7)	−6.9 (19.6)	2.1 (35.8)	9.7 (49.5)	15.7 (60.3)	19.0 (66.2)	17.3 (63.1)	9.8 (49.6)	1.7 (35.1)	−7.8 (18.0)	−17.3 (0.9)	0.5 (32.9)
Record low °C (°F)	−38.6 (−37.5)	−33.6 (−28.5)	−25.7 (−14.3)	−12.7 (9.1)	−2.1 (28.2)	4.3 (39.7)	10.1 (50.2)	5.3 (41.5)	−2.7 (27.1)	−12.9 (8.8)	−25.0 (−13.0)	−33.9 (−29.0)	−38.6 (−37.5)
Average precipitation mm (inches)	5.5 (0.22)	6.5 (0.26)	13.4 (0.53)	26.7 (1.05)	62.5 (2.46)	100.3 (3.95)	171.1 (6.74)	150.3 (5.92)	57.1 (2.25)	28.7 (1.13)	19.2 (0.76)	9.0 (0.35)	650.3 (25.62)
Average precipitation days (≥ 0.1 mm)	5.9	4.8	6.4	6.8	11.6	14.1	14.0	12.7	8.8	7.6	6.9	7.0	106.6
Average snowy days	9.2	7.2	7.7	2.8	0.2	0	0	0	0	2.2	7.0	9.3	45.6
Average relative humidity (%)	68	61	55	49	54	66	78	80	72	63	66	68	65
Mean monthly sunshine hours	166.9	190.1	220.5	221.5	244.5	234.8	213.8	214.4	227.4	198.6	159.0	150.0	2,441.5
Percentage possible sunshine	57	64	59	55	54	51	46	50	61	59	55	54	55
Source: China Meteorological Administration
