= Chuanying, Jilin City =

Chuanying 船营区
- District
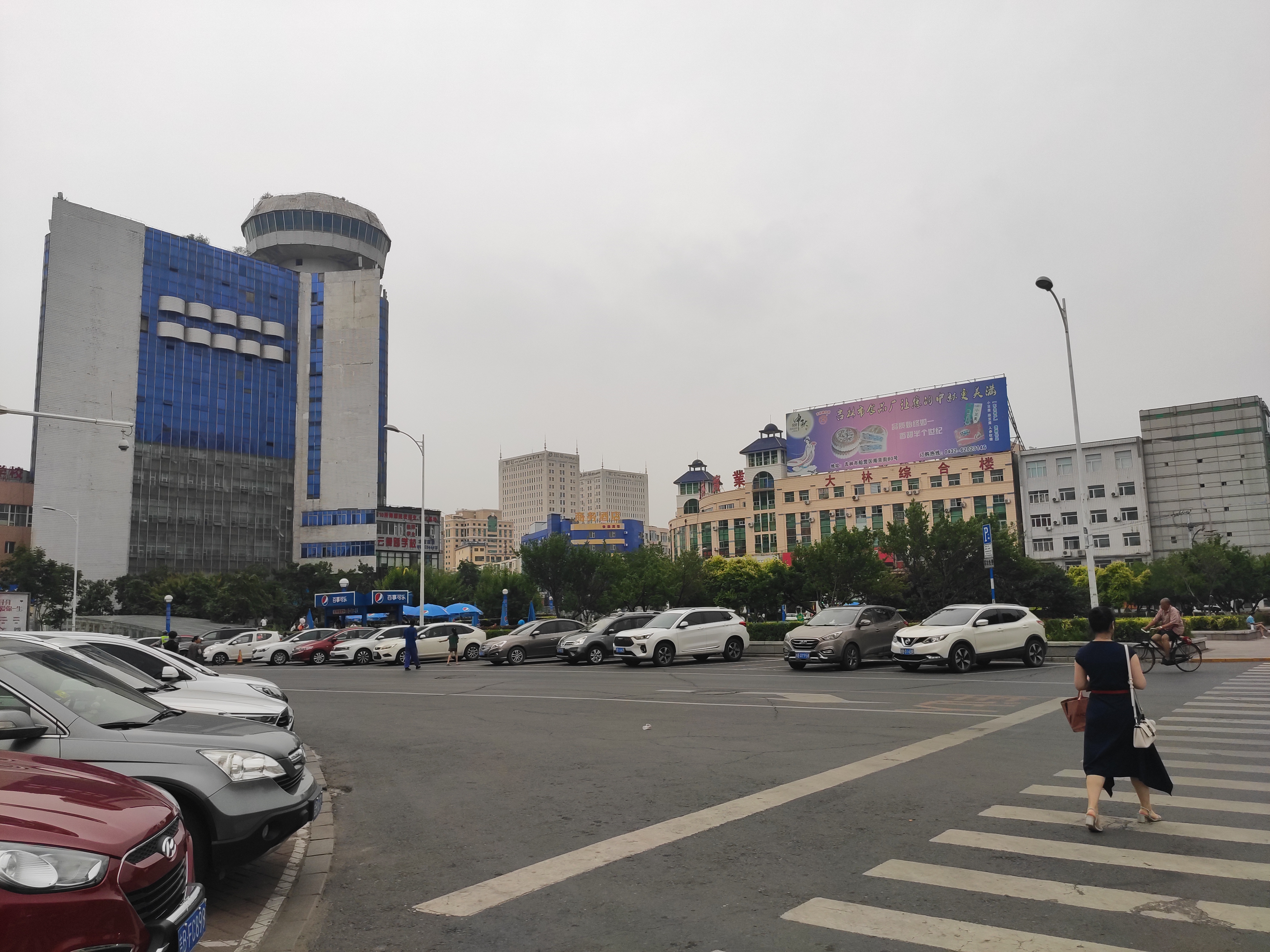
- Dadongmen Square

- Location in Jilin
- Coordinates (Chuanying District government): 43°50′02″N 126°32′27″E
- Country: China
- Province: Jilin
- Prefecture-level city: Jilin City
- Seat: Dadong Subdistrict

Area
  - Total: 685.91 km^{2} (264.83 sq mi)

Population (2020 census)
  - Total: 3,623,713
  - Density: 5,283.1/km^{2} (13,683/sq mi)
- Time zone: UTC+8 (China Standard)
- Website: www.jlcy.gov.cn

Chuanying District (simplified Chinese: 船营区; traditional Chinese: 船營區; pinyin: Chuányíng Qū) is a district of Jilin City, Jilin, China.

== Administrative divisions ==
There are 11 subdistricts, 2 towns and 1 township.

- Desheng Subdistrict (德胜街道)
- Nanjing Subdistrict (南京街道)
- Dadong Subdistrict (大东街道)
- Qingdao Subdistrict (青岛街道)
- Xiangyang Subdistrict (向阳街道)
- Beiji Subdistrict (北极街道)
- Zhihe Subdistrict (致和街道)
- Changchun Road Subdistrict (长春路街道)
- Linjiang Subdistrict (临江街道)
- Beishan Subdistrict (北山街道)
- Huangqi Subdistrict (黄旗街道)
- Dasuihe Town (大绥河镇)
- Yuebei Town (越北镇)
- Huanxi Township (欢喜乡)
