= Gongnong Subdistrict, Songyuan =

Gongnong Subdistrict 工农街道
- Subdistrict
- Location in Jilin
- Coordinates: 45°11′57″N 124°48′9″E
- Country: People's Republic of China
- Province: Jilin
- Prefecture-level city: Songyuan
- District: Ningjiang District
- Time zone: UTC+8 (China Standard)

Gongnong Subdistrict (Chinese: 工农街道; pinyin: Gōngnóng Jiēdào) is a subdistrict in Ningjiang District, Songyuan, Jilin province, China. As of 2018, it has 2 residential communities under its administration.

== See also ==
- List of township-level divisions of Jilin
