= Xinghua Road =

Xinghua Road (兴华路) may refer to:

- Xinghua Road Subdistrict, Gaobeidian, a subdistrict in Gaobeidian, Hebei, China
- Xinghua Road Subdistrict, Qingdao, a subdistrict in Licang District, Qingdao, Shandong, China
- Xinghua Road, Shenzhen, a road in Shenzhen, Guangdong, China

== See also ==
- Xinghua (disambiguation)
