= Xiangyang Subdistrict, Jilin City =

Xiangyang Subdistrict 向阳街道
- Subdistrict
- Location in Jilin
- Coordinates: 43°50′35″N 126°34′51″E
- Country: People's Republic of China
- Province: Jilin
- Prefecture-level city: Jilin City
- District: Chuanying District
- Time zone: UTC+8 (China Standard)

Xiangyang Subdistrict (Chinese: 向阳街道; pinyin: Xiàngyáng Jiēdào) is a subdistrict in Chuanying District, Jilin City, Jilin, China. As of 2018, it has 5 residential communities under its administration.

== See also ==
- List of township-level divisions of Jilin
