= Lingxia, Jilin =

Lingxia 岭下镇
- Town
- Location in Jilin
- Coordinates: 45°50′44″N 122°24′49″E
- Country: People's Republic of China
- Province: Jilin
- Prefecture-level city: Baicheng
- District: Taobei
- Elevation: 212 m (696 ft)
- Time zone: UTC+8 (China Standard)
- Area code: 0436

Lingxia (simplified Chinese: 岭下; traditional Chinese: 嶺下; pinyin: Lǐngxià) is a township of Taobei District, Baicheng, in northwestern Jilin province, People's Republic of China, located less than 5 kilometres (3.1 mi) southeast of the border with Inner Mongolia. It is served by China National Highway 302 and G12 Hunchun–Ulanhot Expressway, and as the crow flies, is more than 40 km (25 mi) northwest of downtown Baicheng and 37 km (23 mi) southeast of Ulan Hot, Inner Mongolia. As of 2011, it has 5 residential communities (社区) and 11 villages under its administration.

== See also ==
- List of township-level divisions of Jilin
