= Dongsheng Township, Taonan =

Dongsheng Township 东升乡
- Township
- Location in Jilin
- Coordinates: 45°48′38″N 121°57′52″E
- Country: People's Republic of China
- Province: Jilin
- Prefecture-level city: Baicheng
- County-level city: Taonan
- Elevation: 258 m (846 ft)
- Time zone: UTC+8 (China Standard)

Dongsheng Township (simplified Chinese: 东升乡; traditional Chinese: 東升鄉; pinyin: Dōngshēng Xiāng; lit. 'east rise') is a township in extreme northwestern Jilin province, China, and it is under the administration of Taonan City. As of 2011, it has 11 villages under its administration. It is about 30 kilometres (19 mi) south-southwest of Ulan Hot, Inner Mongolia, 70 km (43 mi) west-northwest of downtown Baicheng, and 83 km (52 mi) northwest of downtown Taonan.

== See also ==
- List of township-level divisions of Jilin
