= Taishan, Baicheng =

Taishan 太山镇
- Town
- Location in Jilin
- Coordinates: 45°33′37″N 124°04′59″E
- Country: People's Republic of China
- Province: Jilin
- Prefecture-level city: Baicheng
- County-level city: Da'an
- Village-level divisions: 16 villages
- Elevation: 139 m (456 ft)
- Time zone: UTC+8 (China Standard)
- Area code: 0436

Taishan (Chinese: 太山; pinyin: Tàishān) is a town under the administration of Da'an City in northwestern Jilin province, China, located 16 kilometres (9.9 mi) northwest of downtown Da'an along G12 Hunchun–Ulanhot Expressway and China National Highway 302. As of 2018, it has 16 villages under its administration.

== See also ==
- List of township-level divisions of Jilin
