= Xinjian Subdistrict, Jilin City =

Xinjian Subdistrict 新建街道
- Subdistrict
- Location in Jilin
- Coordinates: 43°54′1″N 126°31′43″E
- Country: People's Republic of China
- Province: Jilin
- Prefecture-level city: Jilin City
- District: Changyi District
- Time zone: UTC+8 (China Standard)

Xinjian Subdistrict (Chinese: 新建街道; pinyin: Xīnjiàn Jiēdào) is a subdistrict in Changyi District, Jilin City, Jilin province, China. As of 2018, it has 3 residential communities under its administration.

== See also ==
- List of township-level divisions of Jilin
