= Sanhe Township, Baicheng =

Sanhe Township 三合乡
- Township
- Location in Jilin
- Coordinates: 45°36′43″N 122°41′42″E
- Country: People's Republic of China
- Province: Jilin
- Prefecture-level city: Baicheng
- District: Taobei
- Village-level divisions: 9 villages
- Elevation: 162 m (531 ft)
- Time zone: UTC+8 (China Standard)
- Area code: 0436

Sanhe (Chinese: 三合; pinyin: Sānhé) is a township of Taobei District, Baicheng, Jilin, China, located in the western suburbs about 9 kilometres (5.6 mi) from the southern border of Inner Mongolia. As of 2018, it has 9 villages under its administration.

== See also ==
- List of township-level divisions of Jilin
