= Jingyu County =

Jingyu County 靖宇县
- County
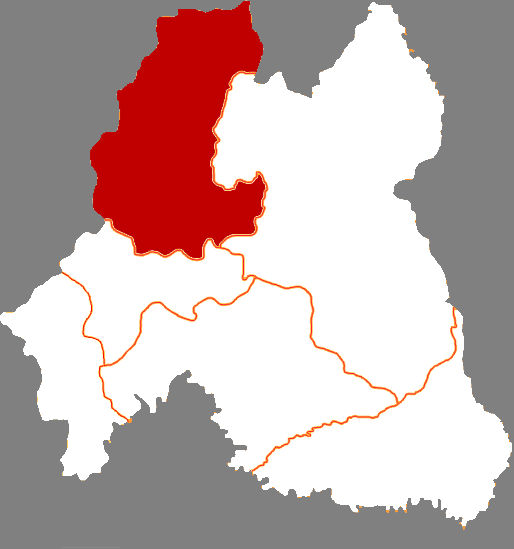
- Location in Baishan City

- Location of the county seat in Jilin
- Coordinates: 42°12′N 126°30′E
- Country: People's Republic of China
- Province: Jilin
- Prefecture-level city: Baishan
- County seat: Jingyu Town

Area
  - Total: 3,094 km^{2} (1,195 sq mi)
- Elevation: 549.2 m (1,802 ft)

Population
  - Total: 144,000
  - Density: 46.5/km^{2} (121/sq mi)
- Time zone: UTC+8 (China Standard)
- Postal code: 135200
- Area code: 0439
- Website: jyx.cbs.gov.cn

Jingyu County (simplified Chinese: 靖宇县; traditional Chinese: 靖宇縣; pinyin: Jìngyǔ Xiàn), formerly Méngjiāng County (simplified Chinese: 蒙江县; traditional Chinese: 蒙江縣) until February 1946, is a county in southern Jilin province, People's Republic of China. It is under the administration of Baishan City. It is named after General Yang Jingyu, who was killed here during World War II.

== Administrative divisions ==
There are seven towns and five townships under the county's administration.

Towns:

- Jingyu (靖宇镇)
- Sandaohu (三道湖镇)
- Huayuankou (花园口镇)
- Xinancha (西南岔镇)
- Longquan (龙泉镇)
- Na'erhong (那尔轰镇)
- Jingshan (景山镇)

Townships:

- Yushuchuan Township (榆树川乡)
- Yanping Township (燕平乡)
- Dongxing Township (东兴乡)
- Chisong Township (赤松乡)
- Mengjiang Township (濛江乡)

== Geography and climate ==
Jingyu is located in southern Jilin and the northern part of Baishan City on the upper reaches of the Songhua River amidst the western periphery of the Changbai Mountains. The bordering county-level divisions are Fusong County to the east, Jiangyuan District to the south, Huinan to the west, and Huadian to the north. Its latitude ranges from 42° 06' to 42° 48' N and longitude 126° 30' to 127° 16' E. The average elevation in the county is 775 metres (2,543 ft), though the county seat is only at 549.2 m (1,802 ft).

Jingyu has a monsoon-influenced, humid continental climate (Köppen Dwb), with long, bitterly cold winters, and short, warm and rainy summers. Spring and autumn are short with some rainfall. The monthly 24-hour average temperature in January is −17.0 °C (1.4 °F), and 21.0 °C (69.8 °F) in July, and the annual mean is +3.9 °C (39.0 °F). The mountainous location means that diurnal temperature variation is large, reaching 17 °C (31 °F) in winter, but precipitation is enhanced: the annual average is 779.5 millimetres (30.7 in), with more than 80% of it falling from May to September. The frost-free period lasts only 104 days.

Climate data for Jingyu, elevation 570 m (1,870 ft), (1991–2020 normals, extremes 1971–present)
Month	Jan	Feb	Mar	Apr	May	Jun	Jul	Aug	Sep	Oct	Nov	Dec	Year
Record high °C (°F)	5.2 (41.4)	12.1 (53.8)	21.7 (71.1)	29.1 (84.4)	31.9 (89.4)	33.4 (92.1)	34.3 (93.7)	32.9 (91.2)	29.8 (85.6)	27.9 (82.2)	18.9 (66.0)	10.1 (50.2)	34.3 (93.7)
Mean daily maximum °C (°F)	−7.7 (18.1)	−3.5 (25.7)	3.5 (38.3)	13.1 (55.6)	20.2 (68.4)	24.4 (75.9)	26.7 (80.1)	25.8 (78.4)	21.0 (69.8)	13.4 (56.1)	2.6 (36.7)	−5.7 (21.7)	11.2 (52.1)
Daily mean °C (°F)	−16.7 (1.9)	−12.0 (10.4)	−3.1 (26.4)	6.3 (43.3)	13.2 (55.8)	18.1 (64.6)	21.3 (70.3)	20.0 (68.0)	13.4 (56.1)	5.4 (41.7)	−4.1 (24.6)	−13.5 (7.7)	4.0 (39.2)
Mean daily minimum °C (°F)	−24.2 (−11.6)	−20.0 (−4.0)	−9.7 (14.5)	−0.6 (30.9)	5.9 (42.6)	11.8 (53.2)	16.4 (61.5)	15.1 (59.2)	6.9 (44.4)	−1.3 (29.7)	−10.1 (13.8)	−20.4 (−4.7)	−2.5 (27.5)
Record low °C (°F)	−41.9 (−43.4)	−40.0 (−40.0)	−31.4 (−24.5)	−16.0 (3.2)	−8.4 (16.9)	0.0 (32.0)	6.4 (43.5)	1.3 (34.3)	−6.5 (20.3)	−17.1 (1.2)	−32.5 (−26.5)	−38.8 (−37.8)	−41.9 (−43.4)
Average precipitation mm (inches)	7.8 (0.31)	12.8 (0.50)	24.1 (0.95)	40.0 (1.57)	81.4 (3.20)	120.4 (4.74)	191.8 (7.55)	175.0 (6.89)	58.6 (2.31)	38.5 (1.52)	30.4 (1.20)	13.3 (0.52)	794.1 (31.26)
Average precipitation days (≥ 0.1 mm)	9.7	8.1	9.9	10.1	13.8	16.3	16.2	15.4	9.8	10.0	10.9	11.2	141.4
Average snowy days	12.9	10.8	12.1	5.5	0.4	0	0	0	0.1	3.5	11.4	14.7	71.4
Average relative humidity (%)	69	65	62	57	63	74	81	83	78	69	71	71	70
Mean monthly sunshine hours	167.8	179.5	210.3	210.3	228.3	213.5	196.4	199.1	208.5	192.2	151.1	147.0	2,304
Percentage possible sunshine	57	60	57	52	50	47	43	47	56	57	52	52	53
Source 1: China Meteorological AdministrationSeptember Record High
Source 2: Weather China
