= Dongsheng Township, Baicheng =

Dongsheng Township 东胜乡
- Township
- Location in Jilin
- Coordinates: 45°40′29″N 122°30′32″E
- Country: People's Republic of China
- Province: Jilin
- Prefecture-level city: Baicheng
- District: Taobei
- Elevation: 179 m (587 ft)
- Time zone: UTC+8 (China Standard)
- Area code: 0436

Dongsheng Township (simplified Chinese: 东胜乡; traditional Chinese: 東勝鄉; pinyin: Dōngshèng Xiāng; lit. 'east victory') is a township of Taobei District, Baicheng, in northwestern Jilin province, People's Republic of China, located more than 25 kilometres (16 mi) north-northwest of downtown Baicheng. As of 2011, it has 21 villages under its administration.

== See also ==
- List of township-level divisions of Jilin
