= Xinhua, Tongyu County =

Xinhua 新华镇
- Town
- Location in Jilin
- Coordinates: 44°34′48″N 122°53′04″E
- Country: People's Republic of China
- Province: Jilin
- Prefecture-level city: Baicheng
- County: Tongyu
- Village-level divisions: 1 residential community 14 villages
- Elevation: 153 m (502 ft)
- Time zone: UTC+8 (China Standard)
- Area code: 0436

Xinhua (simplified Chinese: 新华; traditional Chinese: 新華; pinyin: Xīnhuá; lit. 'new China') is a town in Tongyu County, located in northwestern Jilin province, China. It is situated 29 kilometres (18 mi) southwest of the county seat and about half that northwest of the border with Inner Mongolia. As of 2011, it has one residential community (居委会) and 14 villages under its administration.

== See also ==
- List of township-level divisions of Jilin
