= Pingtai, Jilin =

Pingtai 平台镇
- Town
- Location in Jilin
- Coordinates: 45°34′22″N 122°33′54″E
- Country: People's Republic of China
- Province: Jilin
- Prefecture-level city: Baicheng
- District: Taobei
- Elevation: 165 m (541 ft)
- Time zone: UTC+8 (China Standard)
- Area code: 0436

Pingtai (simplified Chinese: 平台; traditional Chinese: 平台 or 平臺; pinyin: Píngtái; lit. 'platform or terrace') is a town of Taobei District, Baicheng, in northwestern Jilin province, People's Republic of China, located more than 20 kilometres (12 mi) west of downtown Baicheng. As of 2011, it has one residential community (社区) and 14 villages under its administration.

== See also ==
- List of township-level divisions of Jilin
