= Panshi =

Panshi 磐石市 P'an-shih
- County-level city
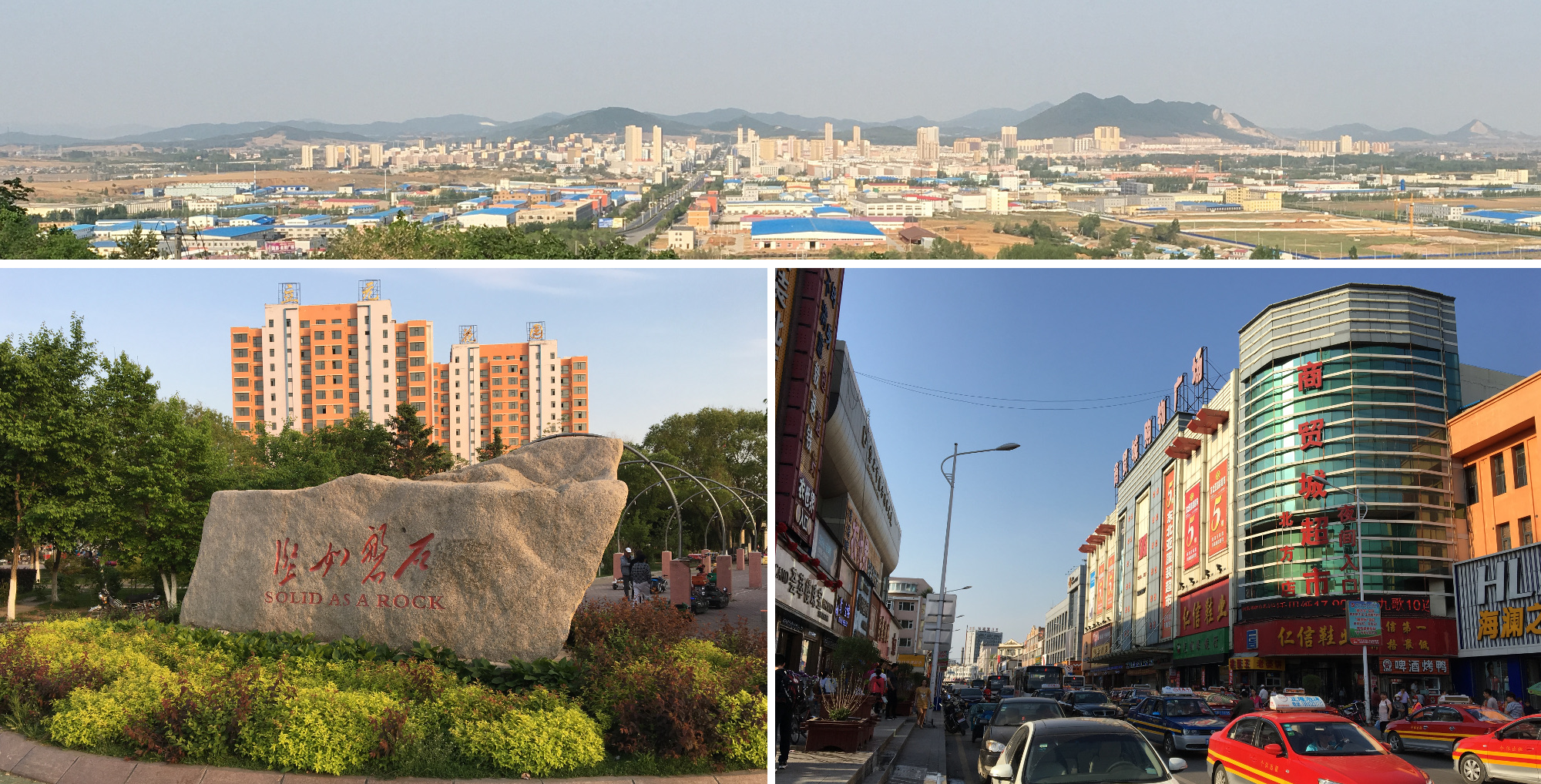
- Panoramic view of Panshi city, entrance to Peoples' Square, downtown shopping strip.

- Location in Jilin
- Coordinates: 42°57′N 126°04′E
- Country: People's Republic of China
- Province: Jilin
- Prefecture-level city: Jilin City
- City Seat: Henan Subdistrict (河南街道)

Area
  - County-level city: 3,960.0 km^{2} (1,529.0 sq mi)
  - Urban: 25.00 km^{2} (9.65 sq mi)
- Elevation: 331 m (1,086 ft)

Population (2017)
  - County-level city: 528,000
  - Urban: 122,200
- Time zone: UTC+8 (China Standard)

Panshi (Chinese: 磐石; pinyin: Pánshí) is a city of south-central Jilin province of Northeast China. It is under the administration of Jilin City.

== Administrative Divisions ==
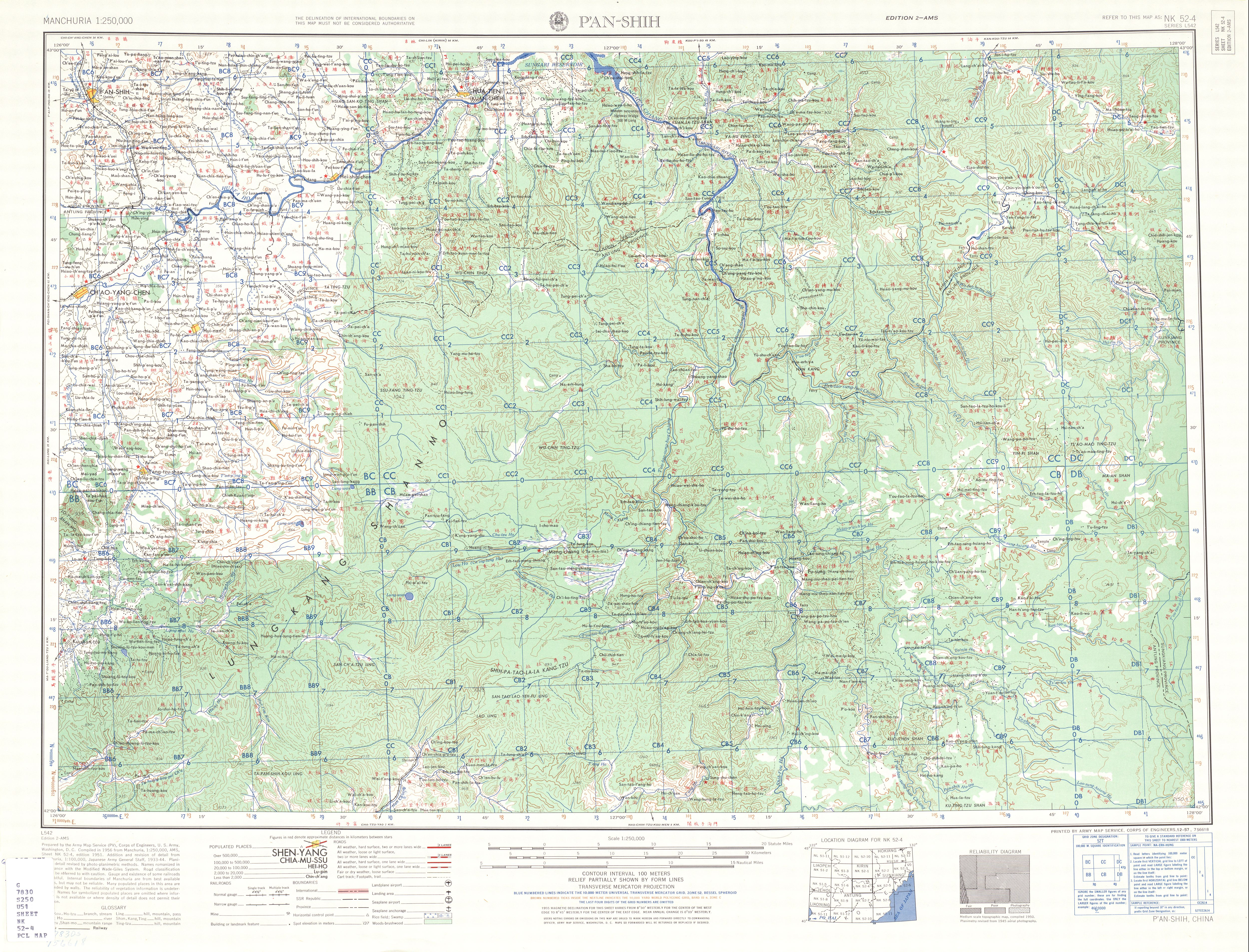
Map including Panshi (labeled as 盤石 P'AN-SHIH) (AMS, 1956)

Subdistricts:

- Henan Subdistrict (河南街道), Dongning Subdistrict (东宁街道), Fu'an Subdistrict (福安街道)

Towns:

- Yantongshan (烟筒山镇), Mingcheng (明城镇), Jichang (吉昌镇), Quchaihe (取柴河镇), Yima (驿马镇), Shiju (石咀镇), Futai (富太镇), hulan (呼兰镇), Hongqiling (红旗岭镇), Songshan (松山镇), Heishi (黑石镇), Niuxin (牛心镇), Chaoyangshan (朝阳山镇)

Townships:

- Baoshan Township (宝山乡)

== Climate ==
Climate data for Panshi, elevation 351 m (1,152 ft), (1991–2020 normals, extremes 1981–2010)
Month	Jan	Feb	Mar	Apr	May	Jun	Jul	Aug	Sep	Oct	Nov	Dec	Year
Record high °C (°F)	5.3 (41.5)	12.9 (55.2)	18.5 (65.3)	29.7 (85.5)	34.0 (93.2)	35.8 (96.4)	35.4 (95.7)	34.1 (93.4)	30.3 (86.5)	26.3 (79.3)	19.4 (66.9)	9.8 (49.6)	35.8 (96.4)
Mean daily maximum °C (°F)	−8.6 (16.5)	−3.4 (25.9)	4.3 (39.7)	14.3 (57.7)	21.4 (70.5)	25.7 (78.3)	27.7 (81.9)	26.5 (79.7)	22.0 (71.6)	13.9 (57.0)	2.5 (36.5)	−6.3 (20.7)	11.7 (53.0)
Daily mean °C (°F)	−16.8 (1.8)	−11.3 (11.7)	−1.9 (28.6)	7.7 (45.9)	14.9 (58.8)	20.0 (68.0)	22.8 (73.0)	21.3 (70.3)	14.9 (58.8)	6.7 (44.1)	−3.5 (25.7)	−13.4 (7.9)	5.1 (41.2)
Mean daily minimum °C (°F)	−23.8 (−10.8)	−18.8 (−1.8)	−7.9 (17.8)	1.1 (34.0)	8.3 (46.9)	14.6 (58.3)	18.3 (64.9)	16.7 (62.1)	8.8 (47.8)	0.5 (32.9)	−8.8 (16.2)	−19.6 (−3.3)	−0.9 (30.4)
Record low °C (°F)	−41.8 (−43.2)	−38.5 (−37.3)	−27.8 (−18.0)	−11.9 (10.6)	−4.1 (24.6)	4.4 (39.9)	9.2 (48.6)	3.2 (37.8)	−4.3 (24.3)	−13.0 (8.6)	−27.8 (−18.0)	−39.4 (−38.9)	−41.8 (−43.2)
Average precipitation mm (inches)	6.3 (0.25)	9.7 (0.38)	16.2 (0.64)	32.9 (1.30)	65.8 (2.59)	112.9 (4.44)	187.2 (7.37)	168.1 (6.62)	57.1 (2.25)	38.3 (1.51)	22.3 (0.88)	11.4 (0.45)	728.2 (28.68)
Average precipitation days (≥ 0.1 mm)	6.2	5.2	6.8	8.2	12.3	14.4	14.7	14.2	9.5	8.4	7.9	7.3	115.1
Average snowy days	9.6	7.4	8.8	3.3	0.1	0	0	0	0	1.9	7.7	9.8	48.6
Average relative humidity (%)	70	66	61	54	59	70	80	82	76	69	71	72	69
Mean monthly sunshine hours	163.5	182.7	209.2	206.6	226.9	215.9	196.4	198.9	216.5	193.4	152.9	147.0	2,309.9
Percentage possible sunshine	56	61	56	51	50	47	43	47	58	57	53	53	53
Source: China Meteorological Administration

Climate data for Yantongshan, Panshi (1991−2020 normals)
Month	Jan	Feb	Mar	Apr	May	Jun	Jul	Aug	Sep	Oct	Nov	Dec	Year
Mean daily maximum °C (°F)	−8.5 (16.7)	−3.4 (25.9)	4.4 (39.9)	14.7 (58.5)	21.7 (71.1)	26.1 (79.0)	27.9 (82.2)	26.7 (80.1)	22.3 (72.1)	14.1 (57.4)	2.7 (36.9)	−6.2 (20.8)	11.9 (53.4)
Daily mean °C (°F)	−16.1 (3.0)	−10.8 (12.6)	−1.6 (29.1)	8.1 (46.6)	15.3 (59.5)	20.4 (68.7)	23.0 (73.4)	21.4 (70.5)	15.2 (59.4)	7.1 (44.8)	−3.0 (26.6)	−12.6 (9.3)	5.5 (42.0)
Mean daily minimum °C (°F)	−22.6 (−8.7)	−17.7 (0.1)	−7.4 (18.7)	1.6 (34.9)	9.0 (48.2)	15.0 (59.0)	18.5 (65.3)	16.9 (62.4)	9.1 (48.4)	1.1 (34.0)	−8.3 (17.1)	−18.4 (−1.1)	−0.3 (31.5)
Average precipitation mm (inches)	5.3 (0.21)	7.3 (0.29)	14.7 (0.58)	30.2 (1.19)	67.6 (2.66)	121.3 (4.78)	176.7 (6.96)	169.2 (6.66)	57.9 (2.28)	36.6 (1.44)	20.8 (0.82)	8.9 (0.35)	716.5 (28.22)
Average precipitation days (≥ 0.1 mm)	6.7	6.1	6.9	7.9	12.5	14.2	14.6	14.1	9.3	8.4	7.4	7.5	115.6
Average snowy days	9.3	7.4	8.3	2.7	0.1	0	0	0	0	2.2	7.3	9.6	46.9
Average relative humidity (%)	70	65	59	52	58	69	80	83	76	66	68	70	68
Mean monthly sunshine hours	164.9	183.7	211.4	209.4	231.0	216.3	198.1	197.8	213.2	187.8	152.6	145.1	2,311.3
Percentage possible sunshine	57	62	57	52	51	47	43	46	58	56	53	52	53
Source: China Meteorological Administration
