= Xiangyang Subdistrict, Taonan =

Xiangyang Subdistrict 向阳街道
- Subdistrict
- Location in Jilin
- Coordinates: 45°19′29″N 122°53′25″E
- Country: People's Republic of China
- Province: Jilin
- Prefecture-level city: Baicheng
- County-level city: Taonan
- Time zone: UTC+8 (China Standard)

Xiangyang Subdistrict (Chinese: 向阳街道; pinyin: Xiàngyáng Jiēdào) is a subdistrict in Taonan, Jilin, China. As of 2018, it has three residential communities and eight villages under its administration.

== See also ==
- List of township-level divisions of Jilin
