= Shanhe Subdistrict =

Shanhe Subdistrict 山河街道
- Subdistrict
- Location in Jilin
- Coordinates: 43°25′5″N 125°55′1″E
- Country: People's Republic of China
- Province: Jilin
- Prefecture-level city: Changchun
- District: Shuangyang District
- Time zone: UTC+8 (China Standard)

Shanhe Subdistrict (Chinese: 山河街道; pinyin: Shānhé Jiēdào) is a subdistrict in Shuangyang District, Changchun, Jilin, China. As of 2018, it has 2 residential communities and 25 villages under its administration.

== See also ==
- List of township-level divisions of Jilin
