= Shihua Subdistrict, Songyuan =

Shihua Subdistrict 石化街道
- Subdistrict
- Location in Jilin
- Coordinates: 45°05′26″N 124°51′10″E
- Country: People's Republic of China
- Province: Jilin
- Prefecture-level city: Songyuan
- District: Ningjiang
- Elevation: 136 m (446 ft)
- Time zone: UTC+8 (China Standard)
- Area code: 0438

Shihua (Chinese: 石化; pinyin: Shíhuà; lit. 'petrification') is a subdistrict of Ningjiang District, Songyuan, in northwestern Jilin province, China. As of 2011, it has 3 residential communities (社区) under its administration.

== See also ==
- List of township-level divisions of Jilin
