= Changyi, Jilin City =

Changyi 昌邑区
- District
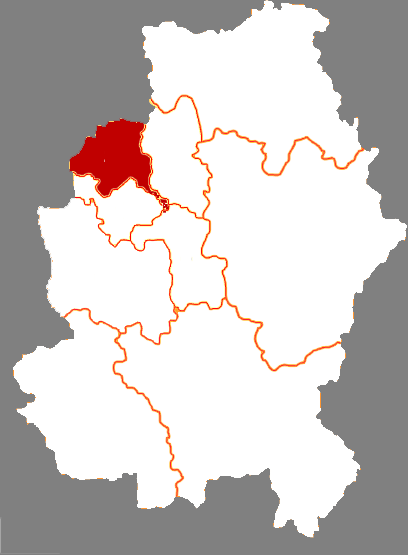
- Changyi in Jilin City

- Location in Jilin
- Coordinates: 43°52′55″N 126°34′29″E
- Country: China
- Province: Jilin
- Prefecture-level city: Jilin City
- Seat: Hadawan Subdistrict (哈达湾街道)
- Time zone: UTC+8 (China Standard)

Changyi District (simplified Chinese: 昌邑区; traditional Chinese: 昌邑區; pinyin: Chāngyì Qū) is a district of Jilin City, Jilin, China.

== Administrative divisions ==
Subdistricts:

- Hadawan Subdistrict (哈达湾街道), Xinghua Subdistrict (兴华街道), Yanjiang Subdistrict (延江街道), Yan'an Subdistrict (延安街道), Minzhu Subdistrict (民主街道), Tongjiang Subdistrict (通江街道), Wenmiao Subdistrict (文庙街道), Qiachunli Subdistrict (怡春里街道), Weichang Subdistrict (维昌街道), Xindihao Subdistrict (新地号街道), Zhanqian Subdistrict (站前街道), Lianhua Subdistrict (莲花街道), Xinjian Subdistrict (新建街道), Dongjuzi Subdistrict (东局子街道), Shuangji Subdistrict (双吉街道), Jiuzhan Subdistrict (九站街道)

Towns:

- Gudianzi (孤店子镇), Huapichang (桦皮厂镇), Zuojia (左家镇)

Townships:

- Jiuzhan Township (九站乡)
