= Daxing, Changling County =

Daxing 大兴镇
- Town
- Location in Jilin
- Coordinates: 44°10′32″N 123°27′20″E
- Country: People's Republic of China
- Province: Jilin
- Prefecture-level city: Songyuan
- County: Changling County
- Time zone: UTC+8 (China Standard)

Daxing (simplified Chinese: 大兴; traditional Chinese: 大興; pinyin: Dàxīng) is a town under the administration of Changling County, Jilin, China. As of 2018, it had 15 villages under its administration.
