= Xinghua, Meihekou =

Xinghua 兴华镇
- Town
- Location in Jilin
- Coordinates: 42°52′03″N 125°51′59″E
- Country: People's Republic of China
- Province: Jilin
- Prefecture-level city: Tonghua
- County-level city: Meihekou
- Village-level divisions: 12 villages
- Elevation: 331 m (1,086 ft)
- Time zone: UTC+8 (China Standard)
- Area code: 0435

Xinghua (simplified Chinese: 兴华镇; traditional Chinese: 興華鎮; pinyin: Xīnghuá Zhèn) is a town under the administration of Meihekou City in southwestern Jilin province, China, located about 40 kilometres (25 mi) northeast of downtown just off of G1212 Shenyang–Jilin Expressway. As of 2011, it has eight villages under its administration.

== See also ==
- List of township-level divisions of Jilin
