= Futai, Jilin =

Futai 富太镇
- Town
- Location in Jilin
- Coordinates: 42°58′16″N 126°15′46″E
- Country: People's Republic of China
- Province: Jilin
- Prefecture-level city: Jilin City
- County-level city: Panshi
- Time zone: UTC+8 (China Standard)

Futai (Chinese: 富太; pinyin: Fùtài) is a town under the administration of Panshi, Jilin, China. As of 2023, it administers Fuxing Residential Community (富兴社区) and the following fourteen villages:

- Futai Village
- Jiefang Village (解放村)
- Zhonghe Village (中和村)
- Liuyang Village (柳杨村)
- Sijia Village (司家村)
- Dongxin Village (东新村)
- Sihe Village (四合村)
- Sandaogang Village (三道岗村)
- Nanyang Village (南阳村)
- Changgang Village (长岗村)
- Nanchanggang Village (南长岗村)
- Huangguajia Village (黄瓜架村)
- Xujia Village (徐家村)
- Xiushui Village (岫水村)
