= Xinghua Subdistrict, Jilin City =

Xinghua Subdistrict 兴华街道
- Subdistrict
- Location in Jilin
- Coordinates: 43°52′24″N 126°33′36″E
- Country: People's Republic of China
- Province: Jilin
- Prefecture-level city: Jilin City
- District: Changyi
- Village-level divisions: 6 residential communities
- Elevation: 195 m (640 ft)
- Time zone: UTC+8 (China Standard)
- Postal code: 132002
- Area code: 0432

Xinghua Subdistrict (simplified Chinese: 兴华街道; traditional Chinese: 興華街道; pinyin: Xīnghuá Jiēdào) is a subdistrict of Changyi District, Jilin City, People's Republic of China. As of 2011, it has six residential communities (社区) under its administration.

== See also ==
- List of township-level divisions of Jilin
