= Shuanggang, Jilin =

Shuanggang 双岗镇
- Town
- Location in Jilin
- Coordinates: 45°06′08″N 122°56′16″E
- Country: People's Republic of China
- Province: Jilin
- Prefecture-level city: Baicheng
- County: Tongyu
- Elevation: 146 m (479 ft)
- Time zone: UTC+8 (China Standard)

Shuanggang (simplified Chinese: 双岗; traditional Chinese: 雙崗; pinyin: Shuānggǎng) is a town in Tongyu County in northwestern Jilin province, China, located 34 kilometres (21 mi) north-northwest of the county seat. As of 2011, it has 2 residential communities (社区) and 5 villages under its administration.

== See also ==
- List of township-level divisions of Jilin
