= Wangou =

- Coordinates: 6.8359°N 14.6915°E
- Country: Cameroon
- Region: Adamawa
- Department: Mbéré

Wangou is a village in the commune of Djohong in the Adamawa Region of Cameroon.

== Climate ==
The climate of Wangou is temperate like most of the villages in the Adamawa Region, as a result of the landscape of small hills covered with savannah.

== Administration ==
Wangou is administered by a traditional chief of the 3rd degree. The main political parties are the Cameroon People's Democratic Movement and the Social Democratic Front.

== Demographics ==
The population of Wangou consists of Gbaya people, who are Catholic and Lutheran.

The traditional dance of the Gbaya is practiced at many ceremonies and Gbaya is the main spoken language.

Marriages are accompanied by a dowry, which is carried out by the contribution of a sum of local money (100 CFA francs) and an arrow-head from the prospective husband to the bride's grandfather.

== Economy ==
The economy is based on the sale of agricultural products (maize, yams, manioc). Transport is by automobile or foot, depending on the route.
