= Taobei, Baicheng =

Taobei 洮北区
- District
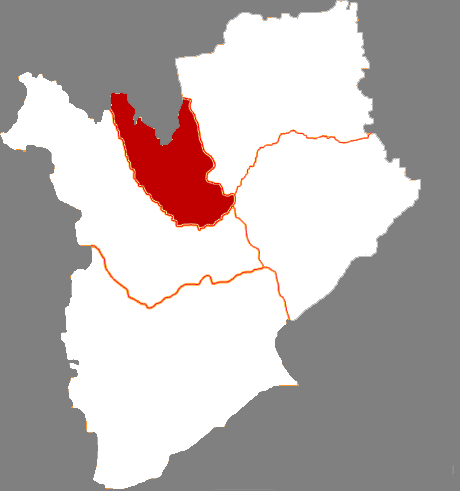
- Location in Baicheng

- Location in Jilin
- Coordinates: 45°37′18″N 122°51′04″E
- Country: China
- Province: Jilin
- Prefecture-level city: Baicheng
- District seat: Haiming Subdistrict

Area
  - Total: 2,578.34 km^{2} (995.50 sq mi)

Population (2020 census)
  - Total: 356,054
  - Density: 138.094/km^{2} (357.663/sq mi)
- Time zone: UTC+8 (China Standard)
- Website: www.taobei.gov.cn

Taobei District (simplified Chinese: 洮北区; traditional Chinese: 洮北區; pinyin: Tāoběi Qū) is the main urban district of the prefecture-level city of Baicheng in China's northeastern Jilin province. It was formerly the county-level city of Baicheng until 1993, when the former Baicheng Prefecture became Baicheng prefecture-level city, while the prefectural capital Baicheng county-level city was renamed Taobei District.

== Administrative divisions ==
There are 12 subdistricts, 7 towns, 4 townships and 1 ethnic township.

- Haiming Subdistrict (海明街道)
- Changqing Subdistrict (长庆街道)
- Ruiguang Subdistrict (瑞光街道)
- Mingren Subdistrict (明仁街道)
- Tiedong Subdistrict (铁东街道)
- Chengnan Subdistrict (城南街道)
- Xinli Subdistrict (新立街道)
- Xingfu Subdistrict (幸福街道)
- Xinhua Subdistrict (新华街道)
- Baoping Subdistrict (保平街道)
- Xijiao Subdistrict (西郊街道)
- Guanyinhao Subdistrict (官银号街道)
- Lingxia Town (岭下镇)
- Ping'an Town (平安镇)
- Qingshan Town (青山镇)
- Linhai Town (林海镇)
- Taohe Town (洮河镇)
- Pingtai Town (平台镇)
- Daobao Town (到保镇)
- Dongfeng Township (东风乡)
- Sanhe Township (三合乡)
- Jinxiang Township (金祥乡)
- Dongsheng Township (东胜乡)
- Deshun Mongol Ethnic Township (德顺蒙古族乡)
