= Jingyu, Jingyu County =

Jingyu 靖宇镇
- Town
- Location in Jilin
- Coordinates: 42°22′59″N 126°48′29″E
- Country: China
- Province: Jilin
- Prefecture-level city: Baishan
- County: Jingyu

Area
  - Total: 165.8 km^{2} (64.0 sq mi)
- Elevation: 544 m (1,785 ft)

Population
  - Total: 57,282
  - Density: 345.5/km^{2} (894.8/sq mi)
- Time zone: UTC+8 (China Standard)
- Postal code: 135200
- Area code: 0439

Jingyu (Chinese: 靖宇; pinyin: Jìngyǔ) is a town in and the county seat of Jingyu County, south-central Jilin province, China. A military rocket launch site (42°12′N 126°30′E) is near this town. The DF-4 is one example of rockets to be tested there.

== See also ==
- Rocket launch site
