= Ningjiang, Songyuan =

Ningjiang 宁江区
- District
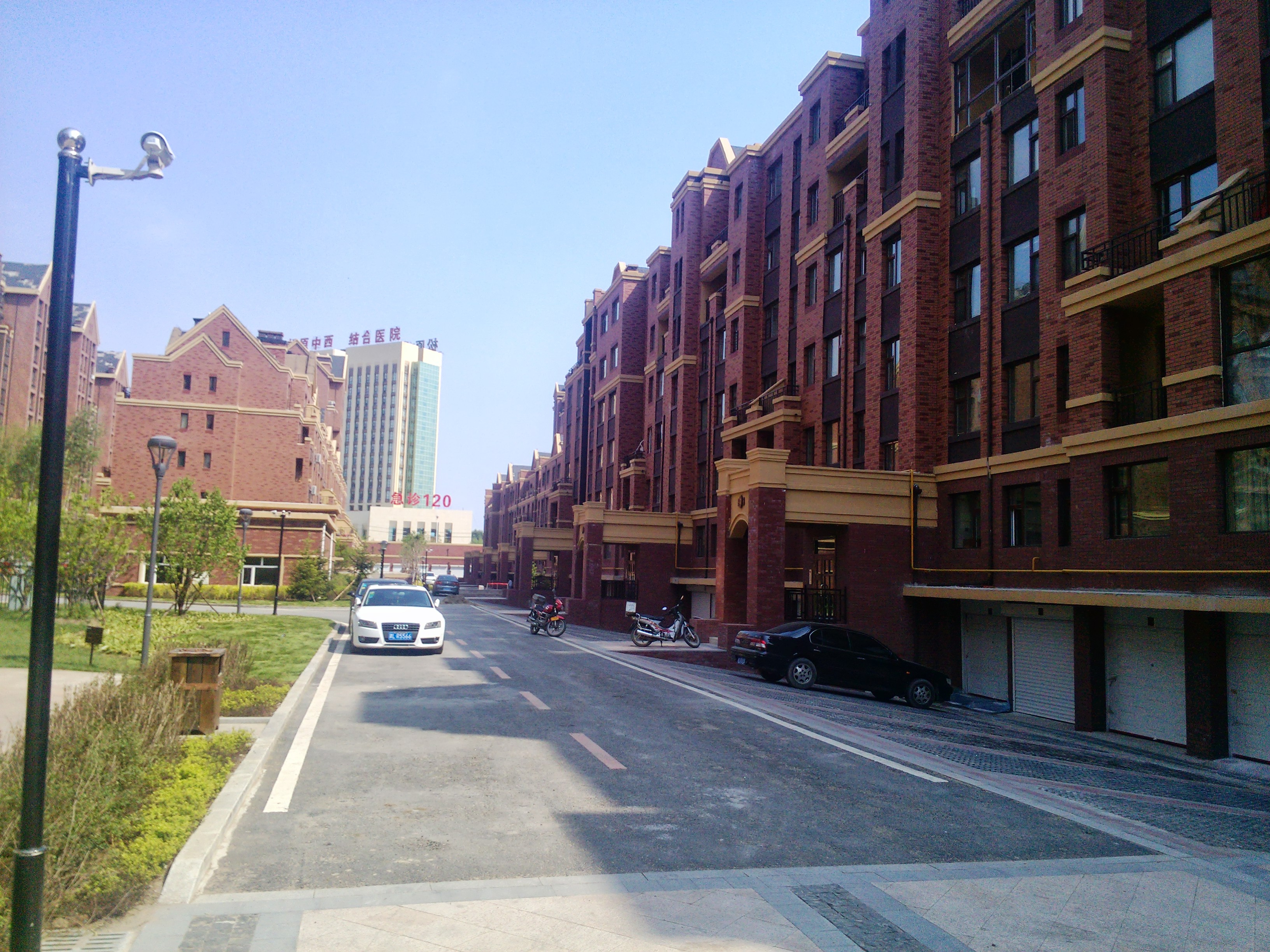

- Location in Jilin
- Coordinates: 45°10′21″N 124°49′02″E
- Country: China
- Province: Jilin
- Prefecture-level city: Songyuan
- District seat: Wenhua Subdistrict

Area
  - Total: 1,250.02 km^{2} (482.64 sq mi)

Population (2020 census)
  - Total: 619,364
  - Density: 495.483/km^{2} (1,283.30/sq mi)
- Time zone: UTC+8 (China Standard)
- Website: www.ningjiang.gov.cn

Ningjiang District (Chinese: 宁江区; pinyin: Níngjiāng Qū) is a district of Songyuan, Jilin, China.

== Administrative divisions ==
There are 17 subdistricts, 4 towns and 3 townships.

- Tuanjie Subdistrict (团结街道)
- Wenhua Subdistrict (文化街道)
- Minzhu Subdistrict (民主街道)
- Linjiang Subdistrict (临江街道)
- Xinqu Subdistrict (新区街道)
- Qianjin Subdistrict (前进街道)
- Heping Subdistrict (和平街道)
- Gongnong Subdistrict (工农街道)
- Yanjiang Subdistrict (沿江街道)
- Tiexi Subdistrict (铁西街道)
- Fanrong Subdistrict (繁荣街道)
- Jianshe Subdistrict (建设街道)
- Shihua Subdistrict (石化街道)
- Bodune Subdistrict (伯都讷街道)
- Changning Subdistrict (长宁街道)
- Binjiang Subdistrict (滨江街道)
- Jinghu Subdistrict (镜湖街道)
- Dawa Town (大洼镇)
- Shanyou Town (善友镇)
- Maoduzhan Town (毛都站镇)
- Hadashan Town (哈达山镇)
- Xincheng Township (新城乡)
- Bodu Township (伯都乡)
- Xingyuan Township (兴原乡)
