= Xinghua Township, Tanchang County =

Xinghua Township 兴化乡
- Township
- Location relative to Sichuan
- Coordinates: 34°04′54″N 104°34′59″E
- Country: People's Republic of China
- Province: Gansu
- Prefecture-level city: Longnan
- County: Tanchang
- Village-level divisions: 8 villages
- Elevation: 2,160 m (7,090 ft)

Population (2008)
  - Total: 10,658
- Time zone: UTC+8 (China Standard)
- Area code: 0939

Xinghua Township (simplified Chinese: 兴化乡; traditional Chinese: 興化鄉; pinyin: Xīnghuà Xiāng) is a township of Tanchang County in southeastern Gansu province, China, located 18 kilometres (11 mi) northeast of the county seat. As of 2011, it has eight villages under its administration.

In 2008 the population was 10,658.

== See also ==
- List of township-level divisions of Gansu
