= Shihua Subdistrict, Ürümqi =

Shihua Subdistrict 石化街道
- Subdistrict
- Location in Xinjiang
- Coordinates: 43°57′42″N 87°41′29″E
- Country: People's Republic of China
- Municipality: Region
- Prefecture-level city: Ürümqi
- District: Midong
- Village-level divisions: 6 residential communities
- Elevation: 641 m (2,103 ft)
- Time zone: UTC+8 (China Standard)

Shihua (Chinese: 石化; pinyin: Shíhuà; lit. 'petrification') is a subdistrict and the seat of Midong District, in the northern part of Ürümqi, Xinjiang, People's Republic of China, located about 16 kilometres (9.9 mi) north of the city centre. As of 2011, it has six residential communities (社区) under its administration.

== See also ==
- List of township-level divisions of Xinjiang
