= Xinghua Township, Liangdang County =

Xinghua Township 兴化乡
- Township
- Location relative to Sichuan
- Coordinates: 33°51′02″N 106°20′20″E
- Country: People's Republic of China
- Province: Gansu
- Prefecture-level city: Longnan
- County: Liangdang
- Village-level divisions: 10 villages
- Elevation: 1,341 m (4,400 ft)
- Time zone: UTC+8 (China Standard)
- Area code: 0939

Xinghua Township (simplified Chinese: 兴化乡; traditional Chinese: 興化鄉; pinyin: Xīnghuà Xiāng) is a township of Liangdang County in southeastern Gansu province, China, located 7.2 kilometres (4.5 mi) southeast of the county seat and 8.1 km (5.0 mi) west of the border with Shaanxi. As of 2011, it has 10 villages under its administration.

== See also ==
- List of township-level divisions of Gansu
