= Zhihe Subdistrict, Jilin =

Zhihe Subdistrict 致和街道
- Subdistrict
- Location in Jilin
- Coordinates: 43°50′43″N 126°32′18″E
- Country: China
- Province: Jilin
- Prefecture-level city: Jilin City
- District: Chuanying District
- Time zone: UTC+8 (China Standard Time)

Zhihe Subdistrict (Chinese: 致和街道; pinyin: Zhìhé Jiēdào) is a subdistrict situated in Chuanying District, Jilin City, Jilin Province, China. As of 2020, it administers the following four residential neighborhoods:

- Youhao Community (友好社区)
- Yueshan Road Community (越山路社区)
- Er'er'er Community (二二二社区)
- Beisi Community (北寺社区)

== See also ==
- List of township-level divisions of Jilin
