= Huayuankou, Jilin =

Huayuankou 花园口镇
- Town
- Location in Jilin
- Coordinates: 42°17′17″N 127°3′52″E
- Country: People's Republic of China
- Province: Jilin
- Prefecture-level city: Baishan
- County: Jingyu County
- Time zone: UTC+8 (China Standard)

Huayuankou (simplified Chinese: 花园口; traditional Chinese: 花園口; pinyin: Huāyuánkǒu) is a town under the administration of Jingyu County, Jilin, China. As of 2018, it has one residential community and 19 villages under its administration.
