= Tongyu County =

Tongyu County 通榆县
- County
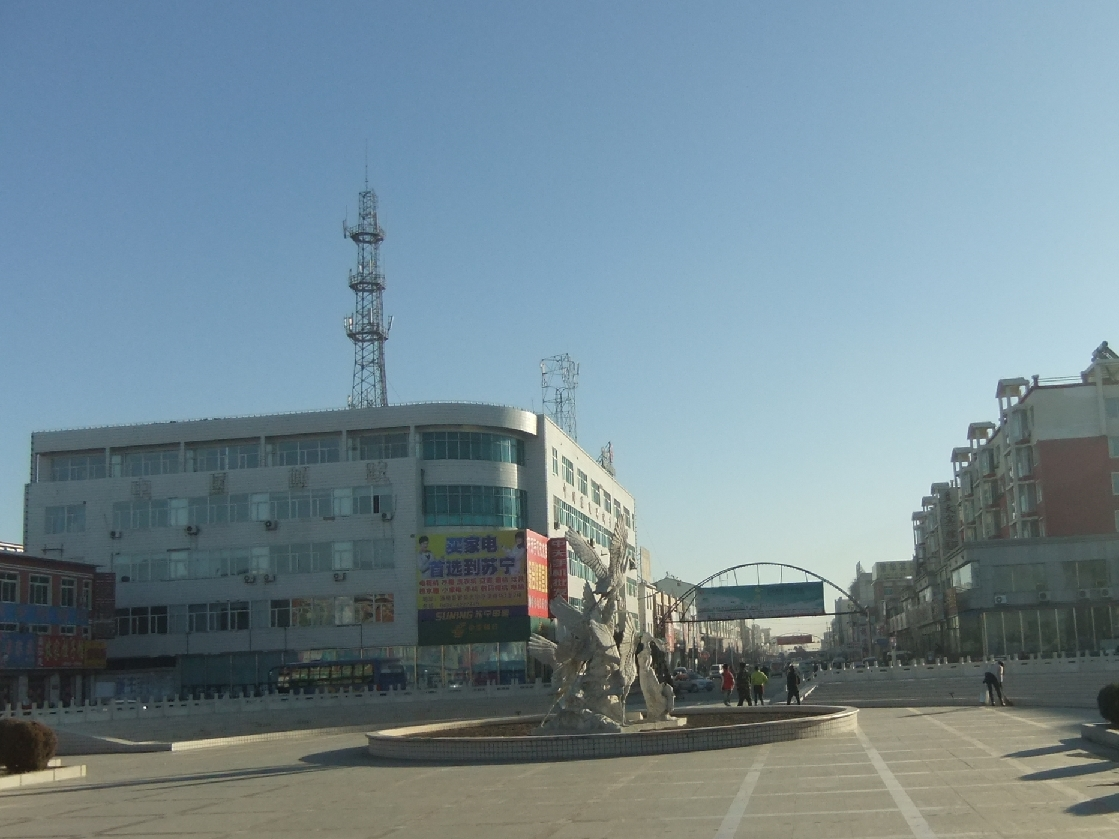

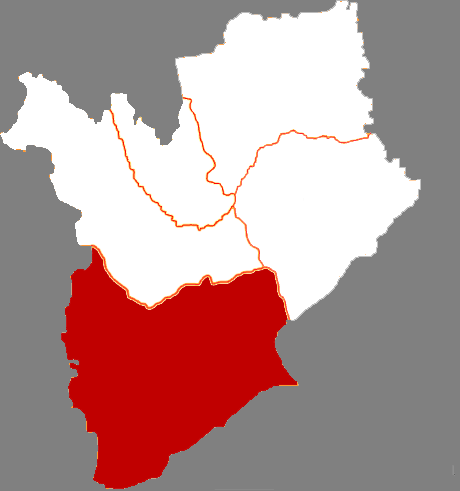
- Tongyu in Baicheng

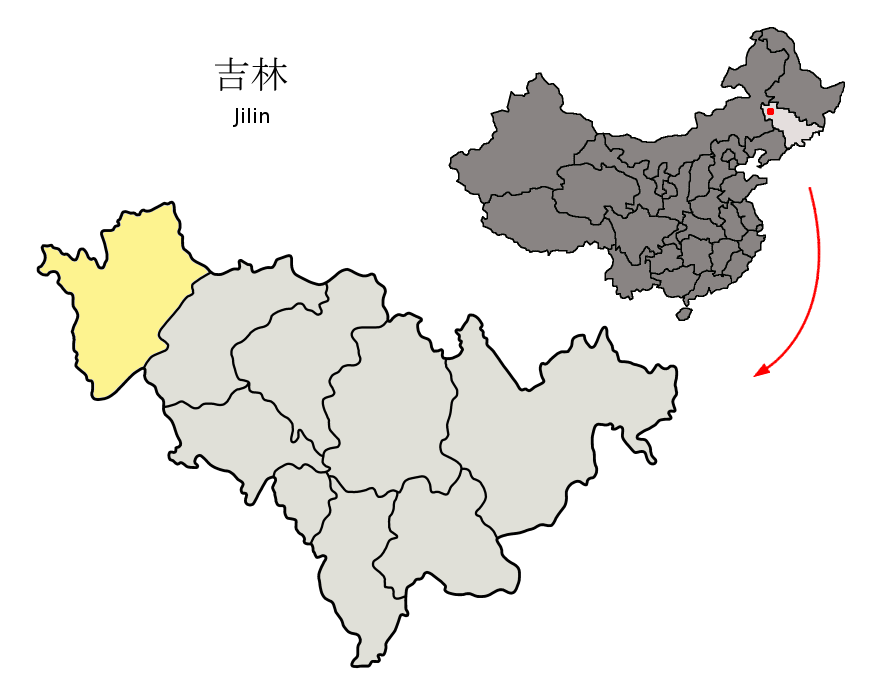
- Baicheng in Jilin
- Coordinates: 44°48′47″N 123°05′17″E
- Country: People's Republic of China
- Province: Jilin
- Prefecture-level city: Baicheng
- County seat: Kaitong (开通镇)

Area
  - Total: 8,476 km^{2} (3,273 sq mi)
- Elevation: 143 m (469 ft)

Population
  - Total: 350,000
  - Density: 41/km^{2} (110/sq mi)
- Time zone: UTC+8 (China Standard)
- Postal code: 137200

Tongyu (Chinese: 通榆; pinyin: Tōngyú) is a county in the northwest of Jilin province, China, bordering Inner Mongolia to the south and west. It is the southernmost county-level division of the prefecture-level city of Baicheng, and has a population of 350,000 residing in an area of 8,476 km^{2} (3,273 sq mi).

The town of Tongyu can be considered to include the areas of Kaitong and Yangjing described below.

== Administrative divisions ==
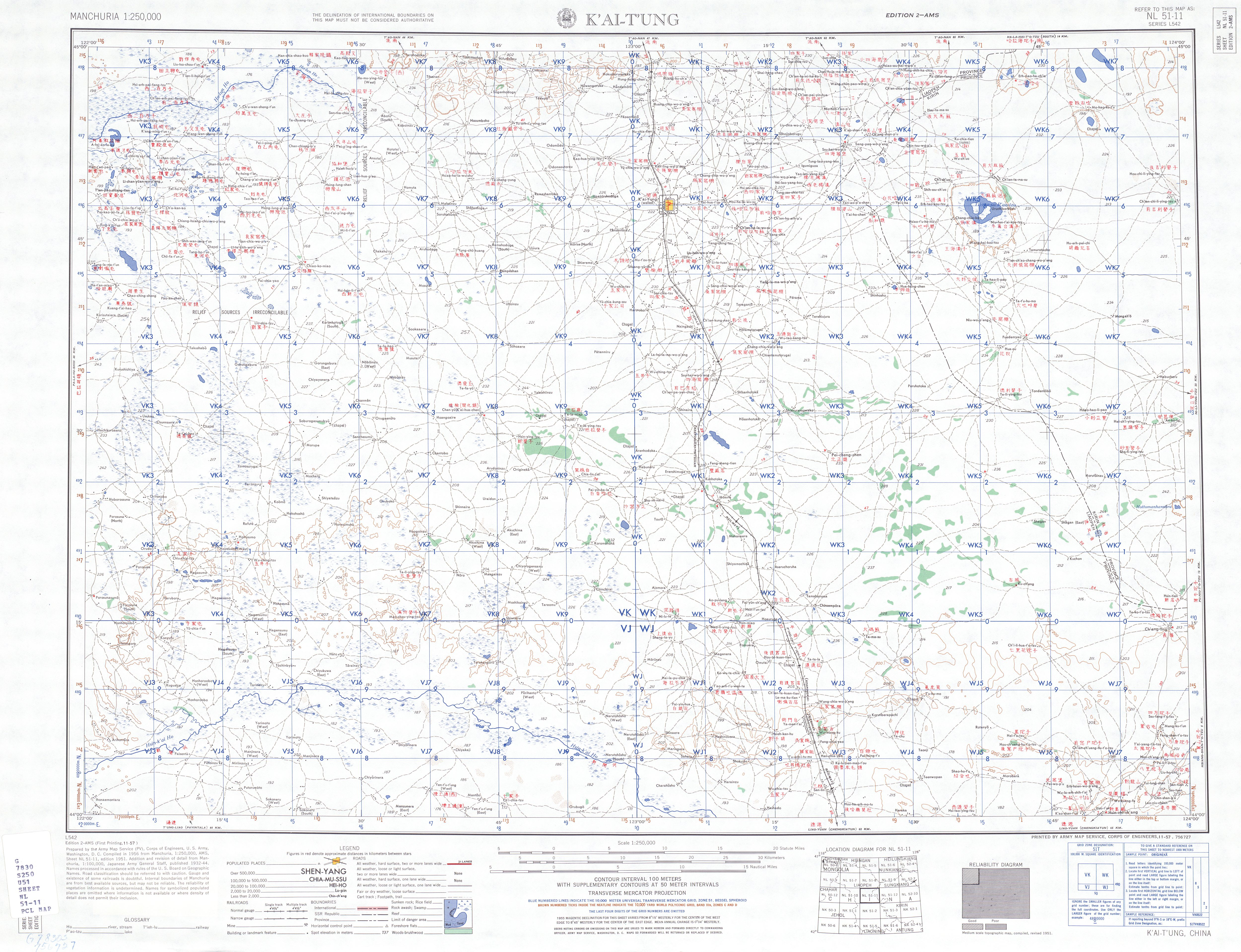
Map including part of modern-day Tongyu County area (AMS, 1956)

There are eight towns, eight townships, and two ethnic townships under the county's administration.

Towns:

- Kaitong (开通镇), Zhanyu (瞻榆镇), Shuanggang (双岗镇), Xinglongshan (兴隆山镇), Bianzhao (边昭镇), Hongxing (鸿兴镇), Xinhua (新华镇), Wulanhua (乌兰花镇)

Townships:

- Yangjing Township (羊井乡), Yongqing Township (永青乡), Xinfa Township (新发乡), Xinxing Township (新兴乡), Tuanjie Township (团结乡), Shihuadao Township (十花道乡), Bamian Township (八面乡), Sugongtuo Township (苏公坨乡), Xianghai Mongol Ethnic Township (向海蒙古族乡), Baolawendu Mongol Ethnic Township (包拉温都蒙古族乡)

== Climate ==
Climate data for Tongyu, elevation 150 m (490 ft), (1991–2020 normals, extremes 1981–2010)
Month	Jan	Feb	Mar	Apr	May	Jun	Jul	Aug	Sep	Oct	Nov	Dec	Year
Record high °C (°F)	4.6 (40.3)	15.6 (60.1)	26.4 (79.5)	32.6 (90.7)	38.4 (101.1)	41.6 (106.9)	39.0 (102.2)	36.5 (97.7)	33.7 (92.7)	29.3 (84.7)	20.3 (68.5)	11.2 (52.2)	41.6 (106.9)
Mean daily maximum °C (°F)	−8.6 (16.5)	−2.8 (27.0)	5.5 (41.9)	15.7 (60.3)	23.2 (73.8)	28.0 (82.4)	29.7 (85.5)	28.1 (82.6)	23.2 (73.8)	14.1 (57.4)	1.9 (35.4)	−7.0 (19.4)	12.6 (54.7)
Daily mean °C (°F)	−15.1 (4.8)	−9.9 (14.2)	−1.3 (29.7)	8.8 (47.8)	16.7 (62.1)	22.1 (71.8)	24.6 (76.3)	22.7 (72.9)	16.5 (61.7)	7.4 (45.3)	−4.1 (24.6)	−13.0 (8.6)	6.3 (43.3)
Mean daily minimum °C (°F)	−20.3 (−4.5)	−15.9 (3.4)	−7.6 (18.3)	1.8 (35.2)	10.0 (50.0)	16.2 (61.2)	19.7 (67.5)	17.6 (63.7)	10.4 (50.7)	1.7 (35.1)	−9.2 (15.4)	−18 (0)	0.5 (33.0)
Record low °C (°F)	−35.1 (−31.2)	−35.1 (−31.2)	−21.7 (−7.1)	−9.8 (14.4)	−1.7 (28.9)	4.8 (40.6)	10.1 (50.2)	7.2 (45.0)	−2.8 (27.0)	−14.5 (5.9)	−23.3 (−9.9)	−32.3 (−26.1)	−35.1 (−31.2)
Average precipitation mm (inches)	1.2 (0.05)	1.6 (0.06)	4.7 (0.19)	11.9 (0.47)	43.1 (1.70)	73.8 (2.91)	101.1 (3.98)	69.5 (2.74)	34.5 (1.36)	15.3 (0.60)	5.0 (0.20)	2.5 (0.10)	364.2 (14.36)
Average precipitation days (≥ 0.1 mm)	2.1	1.6	3.0	3.7	7.2	10.6	11.2	8.7	6.0	4.3	2.6	2.9	63.9
Average snowy days	4.2	3.0	4.2	1.1	0	0	0	0	0	0.9	3.4	4.8	21.6
Average relative humidity (%)	58	48	42	39	45	58	70	72	61	54	55	60	55
Mean monthly sunshine hours	192.2	206.5	244.5	241.3	259.2	249.9	239.2	244.2	242.3	222.2	180.4	171.5	2,693.4
Percentage possible sunshine	67	70	66	59	56	54	51	57	65	66	64	63	62
Source: China Meteorological Administration
