= Reserve Infantry Division of Baicheng =

Chinese Military unit

Reserve Division of Baicheng (1982-86) Reserve Infantry Division of Baicheng (1986-98)
- Active: 1982.8 - 1998.9
- Country: People's Republic of China
- Branch: People's Liberation Army
- Role: Infantry
- Size: Division
- Part of: Jilin Provincial Military District
- Garrison/HQ: Baicheng, Jilin

The Reserve Infantry Division of Baicheng(Chinese: 白城陆军预备役步兵师) was a reserve infantry formation of the People's Liberation Army active between 1982 and 1998.

The formation of the Reserve Division of Baicheng(Chinese: 白城陆军预备役师) started from May 1982 in Baicheng, Jilin. The division was then composed of:

- 1st Regiment - Fuyu
- 2nd Regiment - Zhenlai County
- 3rd Regiment - Taoan County
- Artillery Regiment - Da'an

As of its activation, the division had 13,464 personnel. Among them, there were 78 cadres (officers) in active service, 1,576 cadres with pre-assigned positions, and 11,810 pre-assigned soldiers.

The division was redesignated as the Reserve Infantry Division of Baicheng(Chinese: 白城陆军预备役步兵师) in February 1986.

In August 1986, a Reserve Communications Regiment was activated at Ji'an County and attached to the division. In March 1988, the regiment detached from the division.

In May 1988, the 3rd Infantry Regiment was reactivated at Taonan. By then the division was composed of:

- 1st Infantry Regiment - Fuyu
- 2nd Infantry Regiment - Zhenlai County
- 3rd Infantry Regiment - Taonan
- Artillery Regiment - Da'an

In August 1998, the division merged with the 47th Infantry Division as the 47th Reserve Infantry Division of Jilin Provincial Military District.
