= List of Major National Historical and Cultural Sites in Jilin =

This list is of Major Sites Protected for their Historical and Cultural Value at the National Level in the Province of Jilin, People's Republic of China.

Site	Date	Location	Image	Coordinates	Designation
Ancient Tombs on the Donggou River 洞沟古墓群	Koguryo	Ji'an	Upload file	41°08′52″N 126°13′13″E	1-168
Ancient Tombs at Liuding Mountain 六顶山古墓群	Balhae	Dunhua	Upload file	43°55′02″N 126°28′19″E	1-173
Hwando Mountain City and Gungnae City 丸都山城与国内城	Goguryo	Ji'an	Upload file	41°09′55″N 126°09′28″E	2-52
Lingguang Pagoda 灵光塔	Balhae	Changbai Korean Autonomous County	Upload file	41°25′29″N 128°11′20″E	3-141
Great Jin Dynasty Memorial Stele 大金得胜陀颂碑	Jin	Fuyu County	Upload file	45°20′49″N 125°37′07″E	3-178
Ancient Tombs at Longtou Mountain 龙头山古墓群	Balhae	Helong	Upload file	42°45′00″N 129°12′00″E	3-244
Site of the Middle Capital of the Balhae Kingdom 渤海中京城遗址	Balhae	Helong	Upload file	42°42′48″N 129°08′29″E	4-51
Mao'ershan Tombs 帽儿山墓地	Han	Jilin	Upload file	43°50′53″N 126°37′39″E	4-62
Hanshu Site 汉书遗址	Bronze Age	Da'an	Upload file	45°41′52″N 124°01′22″E	5-26
Xituanshan Site 西团山遗址	Bronze Age	Jilin	Upload file	43°51′14″N 126°36′13″E	5-27
Wanfabozi Site 万发拨子遗址	Warring States to Jin	Tonghua	Upload file	41°41′44″N 125°56′07″E	5-28
Erlonghu Site 二龙湖古城遗址	Warring States	Lishu County	Upload file	43°11′31″N 124°47′38″E	5-29
Luotongshan 罗通山城	Han to Jin	Liuhe County	Upload file		5-30
Baliancheng Site 八连城遗址	Tang to Five Dynasties	Hunchun	Upload file	42°51′31″N 130°16′59″E	5-31
Copper Smelting Sites of Baoshan and Liudaogou 宝山—六道沟冶铜遗址	Tang to Five Dynasties	Linjiang	Upload file		5-32
Tahucheng Site 塔虎城	Liao to Jin	Qian Gorlos Mongol Autonomous County	Upload file	45°23′39″N 124°21′27″E	5-33
Gangouzi Tombs 干沟子墓群	Warring States to Western Han	Changbai Korean Autonomous County	Upload file	41°26′34″N 127°57′13″E	5-157
Family cemetery of Wanyan Xiyin 完颜希尹家族墓地	Jin	Shulan	Upload file		5-158
Baicaogou Site 百草沟遗址	Warring States to Jin	Wangqing County	Upload file	42°51′10″N 128°04′31″E	6-51
Zi'an Shancheng 自安山城	Northern and Southern Dynasties	Tonghua	Upload file	41°45′34″N 125°57′52″E	6-52
Longtanshan Fortress 龙潭山城	Jin	Ji'an	Upload file		6-53
Sumi Fortress 苏密城	Tang	Huadian	Upload file	42°59′25″N 126°46′54″E	6-54
Chengshanzi Mountain Site 城山子山城	Tang	Dunhua	Upload file		6-55
Mopancun Mountain Site 磨盘村山城	Tang to Jin	Tumen	Upload file		6-56
Pianliancheng Site 偏脸城城址	Liao to Jin	Lishu County	Upload file	43°21′25″N 124°19′40″E	6-57
Qinjiatun Site 秦家屯城址	Liao to Jin	Gongzhuling	Upload file		6-58
Chengsijiazi Site 城四家子城址	Liao to Yuan	Baicheng	Upload file	45°23′05″N 122°55′50″E	6-59
Yehebu Site 叶赫部城址	Ming	Siping	Upload file		6-60
Huifa Site 辉发城址	Ming	Huinan County	Upload file		6-61
Dolmens on the Upper Reaches of the Huifa River 辉发河上游石棚墓	Zhou	Meihekou	Upload file		6-244
Jilin Confucian Temple 吉林文庙	Qing	Jilin	Upload file	43°50′28″N 126°34′14″E	6-502
Ashihada Stone Inscriptions 阿什哈达摩崖	Ming	Jilin	Upload file	43°46′06″N 126°40′11″E	6-820
Headquarters of the Linjiang Campaign 四保临江战役指挥部旧址	1945	Linjiang	Upload file	41°48′21″N 126°55′04″E	6-921

== See also ==
- Principles for the Conservation of Heritage Sites in China
