= Zhou Guotai =

Chinese major general

- 周国泰
- Born: August 30, 1949 (age 77); Zhenlai County, Jilin, China
- Military career
- Allegiance: People's Republic of China
- Branch: People's Liberation Army Ground Force
- Service years: 1968–2015
- Rank: Major general
- Awards: First-class National Scientific and Technological Progress Award

Zhou Guotai (simplified Chinese: 周国泰; traditional Chinese: 周國泰; pinyin: Zhōu Guótài; born 30 August 1949) is a former major general of the Chinese People's Liberation Army, and former director of Research and Development Center for Security and Protection of Tsinghua University. Zhou is also a fellow of the Chinese Academy of Engineering. He has been hailed as "father of China's bulletproof vest".

In October 2015, he was placed under investigation by the military's anti-corruption agency for "serious violations of discipline". He previously served as deputy head of Oil Supplies Division of PLA General Logistics Department. He is so far the first academician from the Chinese Academy of Engineering sacked for graft since the beginning of Communist Party general secretary Xi Jinping's ongoing anti-corruption battle after he took power in the 18th National Congress of the Chinese Communist Party.

== Biography ==
Zhou was born in Zhenlai County, Jilin, China, on August 30, 1949, with his ancestral home in Wendeng, Shandong.

Zhou enlisted in the People's Liberation Army in October 1968, and joined the Chinese Communist Party in April 1971. In 1976 he graduated from Sun Yat-sen University with a degree in chemistry. In 1999 he was elected as a member of the Chinese Academy of Engineering. A year later, he was promoted to the rank of major general (shao jiang). In January 2001 he became the deputy head of Oil Supplies Division of PLA General Logistics Department.

On October 21, 2015, he came under investigation for alleged "serious violations of discipline" and his case was transferred to the military procuratorate.

== Awards ==
- Outstanding Contribution Award of Young Experts (1999)
- Nie Rongzhen Invention Award (2002)
- Science and Technology Award of the Ho Leung Ho Lee Foundation (2002)
- First-class National Scientific and Technological Progress Award
