= Li Hongbo =

Chinese artist (born 1974)

Li Hongbo 李洪波
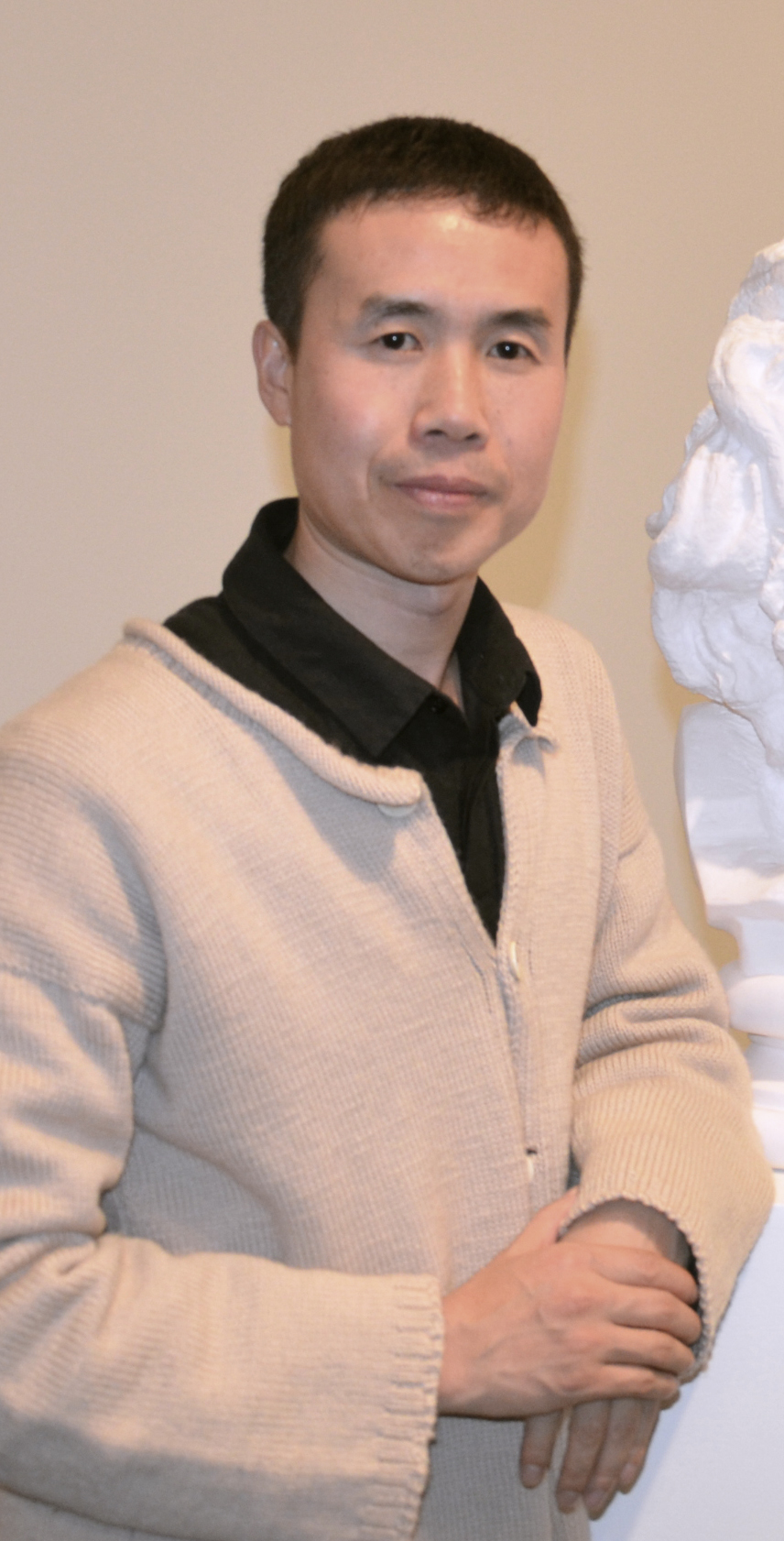
- Born: 7 January 1974 (age 52); Jilin

Li Hongbo (Chinese: 李洪波; pinyin: Li Hongbo) is a Chinese artist born in Jilin in 1974. He earned his Bachelor of Fine Arts degree from Jilin Normal University in 1996, Master of Fine Arts (MFA) degree in Folk Art in 2001, MFA degree in Experimental Art in 2010, both from the Central Academy of Fine Arts in Beijing. Li Hongbo is best known for his lifelike paper sculptures, made entirely out of paper and glue. His work has been exhibited in museums around the world.

Li's works have been exhibited internationally. Most recently, his works were displayed at Ludwigsburg Museum in Germany (2013), the 18th Biennale of Sydney in Australia (2012), and Klein Sun Gallery in New York (2013). Li's first solo exhibit in North America titled Tools of Study at Klein Sun Gallery, received worldwide attention.

He now lives and works in Beijing, China.

== Works ==
Li Hongbo's works are characterized by their unique media- paper and glue. Initially inspired by the idea of tradition and ubiquity that paper embodies, Li creates a hidden element of surprise in his paper sculptures that stretch in infinitely many ways. The static and emotionless state of the sculptures transform into unpredictable images, ultimately accentuating the difference between restriction and freedom.

Each bust comprises roughly 7,000 to 26,000 sheets of white paper stacked on top of each other. They are glued manually in a honeycomb structure, allowing the resulting sculptures complete flexibility and sturdiness.

Exhibition History

Solo Exhibitions
2014 "Tools of Study," Klein Sun Gallery, New York, NY
2013 "Li Hongbo - Out of Paper," Kunstverein Ludwigsburg, Ludwigsburg, Germany
2012 “Self,” Schoeni Art Gallery, Hong Kong
2012 “A Tree,” Mizuma & One Gallery, Beijing, China
2011 “The World – Li Hongbo New Works Exhibition,” Found Museum, Beijing, China; Modern Art Gallery, Taichung, Taiwan

Selected Group Exhibitions

=== 2013 ===
- "Confronting Anitya,” Palazzo Michiel, Venice, Italy
- “CODA Paper Art 2013,” CODA Museum, Apeldoorn, The Netherlands
- “PaperWorks: The Art and Science of an Extraordinary Material,” Berkshire Museum, Pittsfield, MA
- “Hot Pot,” Brattleboro Museum, Brattleboro, VT
- “Transformation – A Perspective of Contemporary Art,” 53 Art Museum, Guangzhou, China
- “Freeze Frame Moments – 2013 Young Artist Invitational Exhibition,” Nen Art Museum, Guangzhou, China
- “Insightful Charisma,” Shanghai Himalayas Museum, Shanghai, China
- “Tan Wei Guan Zhi,” Wu Niu Visual and Packing Institute Visual Arts Museum, Chengdu, China

=== 2012 ===
- “Ctrl + N: Non-Linear Practice,” Gwangju Museum of Art, Gwangju, South Korea
- “Material àla Object,” Eli Klein Fine Art, New York, NY
- “All our relations,” 18th Biennale of Sydney, Australia
- “Research Exhibition on Post-70’s Generation Artists Jianghan Star Plan,” Wu Han Art Museum, Wu Han, China
- “The Start of a Long Journey: The Collection of Excellent Graduate Works from The Central Academy of Fine Arts (2009 – 2011),” Art @ Golden Square, London, England
- “1st Xinjiang Biennale,” Xinjiang International Exposition Centre, Ürümqi, Xinjiang, China

=== 2011 ===
- "Start from the Horizon: Chinese Contemporary Sculpture Since 1978," Sishang Art Museum, Beijing, China
- “Material → Object,” EK Projects, Beijing, China
- “Experimental Art,” Central Academy of Fine Arts Museum, Beijing, China

=== 2010 ===
- “The Big Bang,” White Rabbit Foundation, Sydney, Australia
- “Journey of a Thousand Miles,” Central Academy of Fine Arts Museum, Beijing, China
- “Object Energy,” Found Museum, Beijing, China
- “Tien Kung Kai Wu,” Deshan Art Space, Beijing, China
- “I’m on the Road to…,” Mizuma & One Gallery, Beijing, China

=== 2007 ===
- “The Desire for Material Welfare & No Wants,” Jin Du Art Center, Beijing, China
- “Shared Time and Space,” K Space, Beijing, China

== Publications ==
- Li Hongbo (2014). A Piece of Paper (in Chinese and English). Beijing: Cathay Bookshop Publishing House. ISBN 978-7-5149-0902-9. OCLC 899212075. An exhibition catalog.
