= Music of Jilin =

Music in China

Jilin is a northeastern province of China. The region is home to many kinds of musical theater, especially opera. These include styles like Huanglong opera, Xincheng opera, Jilin opera, and errenzhuan (Bangzixi or Benbeng opera).

Errenzhuan is a popular kind of opera that evolved from a folk dance called dongbeidayangge and folk songs like lianhualao, a kind of ballad. Jilin opera is a recent invention, coming from 1959, while Fuyu County's Xincheng opera is based on Man octagonal drum music. The Huanglong opera of Nong'an County is based on shadow play.

Jilin's folk heritage includes Han wind music and dongbei dagu (drum storytelling), yangge music, the wuliger and halaibo singing traditions of the Mongols, and Korean gudaling and pansori.
