= Dong Yanping =

Political and military figure of Taiwan

Dong Yanping (1896 – November 5, 1976) was a political and military figure of Taiwan. His original name was Zhifang, and his courtesy name was Peiqing. He was a native of Horqin Right Front Banner in Inner Mongolia (now part of Taonan City, Jilin Province).

== Biography ==
In the spring of 1918, Dong Yanping went to Japan to study. In 1921, he earned a bachelor's degree in law from Meiji University. After returning to the Republic of China, he enrolled at the Northeast Military Academy and graduated in 1925. In the winter of 1927, he went back to Japan to study at the Army War College and graduated in 1930. Upon returning to China, he was appointed Military Secretary at the Headquarters of the Commander-in-Chief of the Northeast Frontier Defense Army.

In November 1931, he became Chief of Staff at the Tianjin Martial Law Command and later served as Chief of Staff of the 105th Division. In the autumn of 1935, he was promoted to Major General and commanded the 1st Brigade of the 105th Division. In 1937, he was appointed Deputy Commander of the 49th Army. Following the outbreak of the Second Sino-Japanese War, he participated in the Battle of Cangzhou and the Battle of Shanghai. He later held positions as Director of the Military Training Inspection Office and Head of the Military Training Department, before being transferred to serve as Chief of Staff of the 11th Group Army Headquarters.In August 1945, he was appointed Deputy Chief of Staff of the Northeast Headquarters of the Military Affairs Commission and concurrently served as Head of the Chinese Military Mission to the Soviet Union. In the winter of 1946, he served as a delegate to the National Constituent Assembly. In the winter of 1947, he was elected as a delegate to the National Assembly. In February 1948, he became Chairman of the Andong Provincial Government and, in May of the same year, a member of the Political Affairs Committee of the Northeast Headquarters.

As the Kuomintang (KMT) suffered defeats during the Chinese Civil War, Dong Yanping fled to Taiwan, where he retained his position as a National Assembly delegate. He later served as Director of the Northeast Research Institute under the Academia Sinica. He also held posts as Deputy Secretary-General of the KMT Central Policy Committee and as an advisor on party affairs. Dong Yanping passed away in Taipei on November 5, 1976, at the age of 80.
