= Baicheng Chang'an Airport =

Airport in Jilin, China

Baicheng Chang'an Airport 白城长安机场
- IATA: DBC; ICAO: ZYBA

Summary
- Airport type: Public
- Serves: Baicheng, Jilin
- Location: Taohe, Taobei District
- Opened: 31 March 2017; 9 years ago
- Coordinates: 45°30′19″N 123°01′11″E

Map
- Location of airport in Jilin

Runways
Direction	Length		Surface
Direction	m	ft	Surface
07/25	2,500	8,202	Concrete

Statistics (2021)
- Passengers: 95,691
- Aircraft movements: 1,934
- Cargo (metric tons): 1.4

Baicheng Chang'an Airport
- Simplified Chinese: 白城长安机场
- Traditional Chinese: 白城長安機場
Transcriptions
Standard Mandarin
- Hanyu Pinyin: Báichéng Cháng'ān Jīchǎng

Baicheng Chang'an Airport (IATA: DBC, ICAO: ZYBA) is an airport serving the city of Baicheng in China's northeastern Jilin Province. It is located in the town of Taohe (洮河) in Taobei District, 16.5 kilometres (10.3 mi) from the city center. The airport received approval from the central government on October 14, 2012, and construction began on October 26, 2012. The total investment is 480 million yuan. The airport was opened on 31 March 2017, the fifth civil airport in Jilin province.

== Facilities ==
The airport has a runway that is 2,500 meters long and 45 meters wide (class 4C), and a 4,471-square-meter terminal building. It is designed to handle 200,000 passengers and 700 tons of cargo annually by 2020.

== Airlines and destinations ==
Airlines	Destinations
China United Airlines	Beijing–Daxing, Shanghai–Pudong, Shijiazhuang

== See also ==
- List of airports in China
- List of the busiest airports in China
