= Zhenlai County =

Zhenlai County 镇赉县
- County
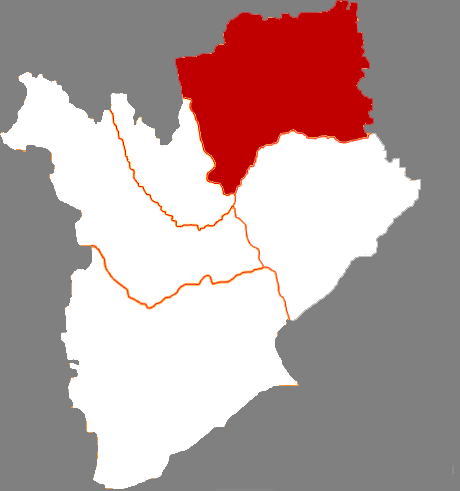
- Zhenlai in Baicheng

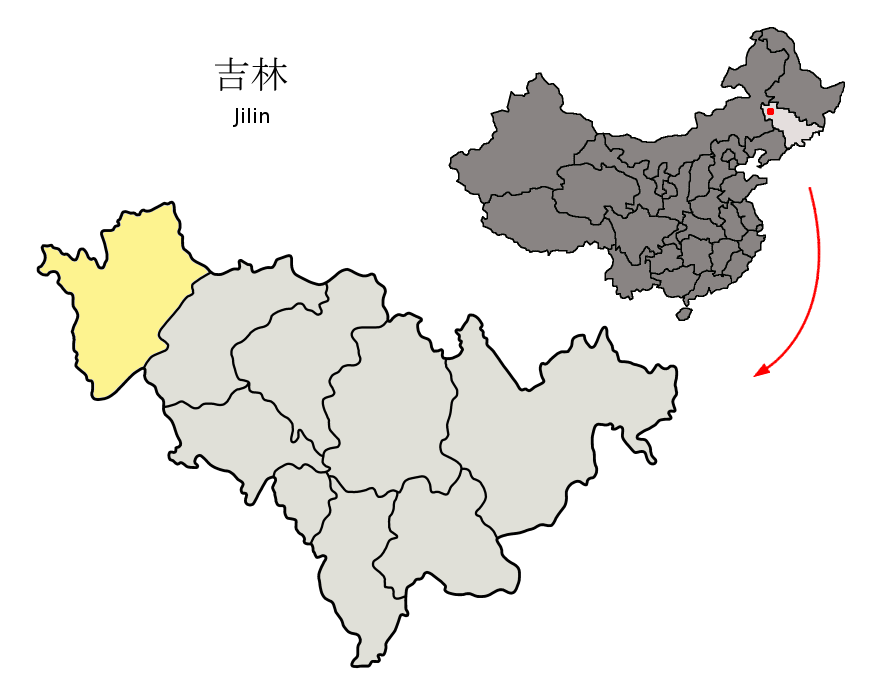
- Baicheng in Jilin
- Coordinates: 45°50′51″N 123°12′00″E
- Country: People's Republic of China
- Province: Jilin
- Prefecture-level city: Baicheng
- County seat: Zhenlai Town (镇赉镇)

Area
  - Total: 5,389 km^{2} (2,081 sq mi)
- Elevation: 140 m (460 ft)

Population
  - Total: 310,000
  - Density: 58/km^{2} (150/sq mi)
- Time zone: UTC+8 (China Standard)
- Postal code: 137300

Zhenlai County (simplified Chinese: 镇赉县; traditional Chinese: 鎮賚縣; pinyin: Zhènlài Xiàn) is a county in northwestern Jilin province, China, occupying the northernmost part of the province and bordering Heilongjiang to the east and Inner Mongolia to the west. It is under the administration of the prefecture-level city of Baicheng, with a population of 310,000 residing in an area of 5,389 km^{2} (2,081 sq mi).

== Administrative divisions ==
There are seven towns, two townships, and two ethnic township.

Towns:

- Zhenlai (镇赉镇)
- Tantu (坦途镇)
- Dongping (东屏镇)
- Datun (大屯镇)
- Heiyupao (黑鱼泡镇)
- Wukeshu (五棵树镇)
- Yanjiang (沿江镇)

Townships:

- Jianping Township (建平乡)
- Gashigen Township (嘎什根乡)
- Hatuqi Mongol Ethnic Township (哈吐气蒙古族乡)
- Momoge Mongol Ethnic Township (莫莫格蒙古族乡)

== Climate ==
Climate data for Zhenlai, elevation 141 m (463 ft), (1991–2020 normals, extremes 1981–2010)
Month	Jan	Feb	Mar	Apr	May	Jun	Jul	Aug	Sep	Oct	Nov	Dec	Year
Record high °C (°F)	4.2 (39.6)	11.8 (53.2)	23.4 (74.1)	32.7 (90.9)	39.3 (102.7)	40.0 (104.0)	38.0 (100.4)	36.9 (98.4)	33.9 (93.0)	28.8 (83.8)	18.6 (65.5)	6.7 (44.1)	40.0 (104.0)
Mean daily maximum °C (°F)	−9.5 (14.9)	−3.7 (25.3)	5.0 (41.0)	15.2 (59.4)	22.8 (73.0)	27.5 (81.5)	29.1 (84.4)	27.5 (81.5)	22.4 (72.3)	13.4 (56.1)	0.9 (33.6)	−8.2 (17.2)	11.9 (53.4)
Daily mean °C (°F)	−16.3 (2.7)	−11.0 (12.2)	−2.0 (28.4)	8.3 (46.9)	16.3 (61.3)	21.7 (71.1)	24.1 (75.4)	22.1 (71.8)	15.8 (60.4)	6.7 (44.1)	−5.2 (22.6)	−14.3 (6.3)	5.5 (41.9)
Mean daily minimum °C (°F)	−21.8 (−7.2)	−17.5 (0.5)	−9.0 (15.8)	0.9 (33.6)	9.4 (48.9)	15.8 (60.4)	19.1 (66.4)	16.9 (62.4)	9.5 (49.1)	0.7 (33.3)	−10.4 (13.3)	−19.4 (−2.9)	−0.5 (31.1)
Record low °C (°F)	−37.7 (−35.9)	−38.0 (−36.4)	−22.6 (−8.7)	−9.9 (14.2)	−3.0 (26.6)	2.5 (36.5)	9.1 (48.4)	6.9 (44.4)	−3.1 (26.4)	−19.7 (−3.5)	−27.3 (−17.1)	−34.6 (−30.3)	−38.0 (−36.4)
Average precipitation mm (inches)	1.8 (0.07)	2.3 (0.09)	4.9 (0.19)	16.4 (0.65)	37.0 (1.46)	84.2 (3.31)	115.5 (4.55)	69.7 (2.74)	41.0 (1.61)	13.7 (0.54)	4.5 (0.18)	4.0 (0.16)	395 (15.55)
Average precipitation days (≥ 0.1 mm)	3.1	2.1	3.0	4.1	7.7	11.3	12.0	9.7	7.3	4.3	3.6	4.3	72.5
Average snowy days	4.5	2.7	3.8	1.3	0	0	0	0	0	0.9	4.1	5.8	23.1
Average relative humidity (%)	61	51	42	39	46	60	72	73	63	53	56	62	57
Mean monthly sunshine hours	208.3	226.5	269.6	263.8	283.8	273.9	267.1	269.8	258.8	234.2	193.8	185.6	2,935.2
Percentage possible sunshine	74	77	73	65	61	58	57	62	70	70	69	69	67
Source: China Meteorological Administration
