= Jilin Normal University =

University in Siping, China

Jilin Normal University (simplified Chinese: 吉林师范大学; traditional Chinese: 吉林師範大學; pinyin: Jílín Shīfàn Dàxué) is a university in Siping, Jilin, northeast China. It was formerly known as the Siping Normal Institute (Chinese: 四平师范大学; pinyin: Sìpíng Shīfàn Dàxué). The university was founded in 1958. It is a training center for Jilin provincial teachers, and has trained more than 22,000 teachers in recent years via various types of seminars and classes.

Jilin Normal University covers more than 920,000 square metres totally and its building area covers more than 500,000 square meters. It has 22 colleges, 2 teaching sections, 27 research institutions and 117 labs now. Its teaching staff contains 1493 persons, wherein 994 persons are full-time teachers. There are 10 doctorate tutors, 230 master's degree tutors, 212 professors and 210 associate professors teaching 55 undergraduate majors in this school.
