= Taonan =

Taonan 洮南市
- County-level city
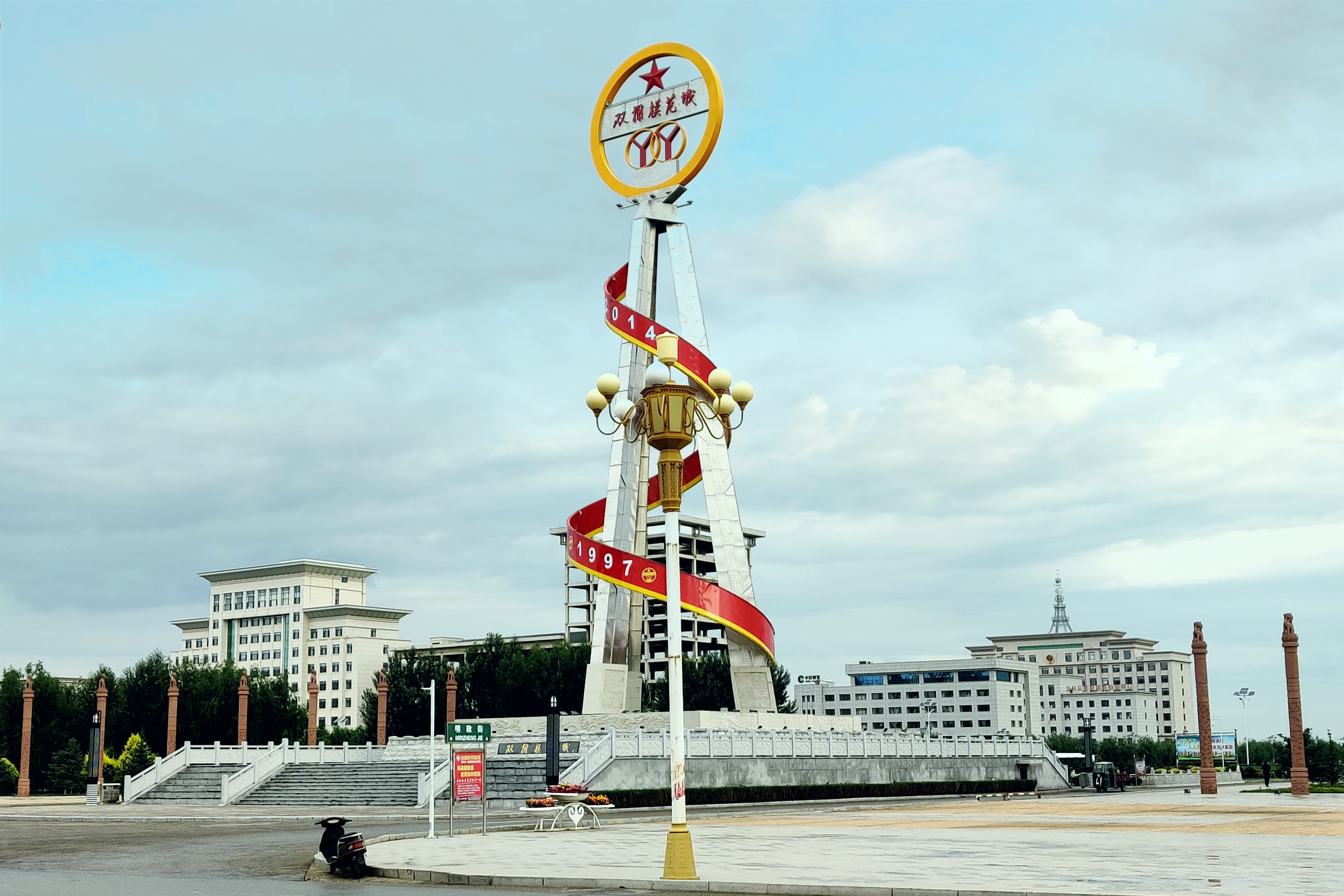

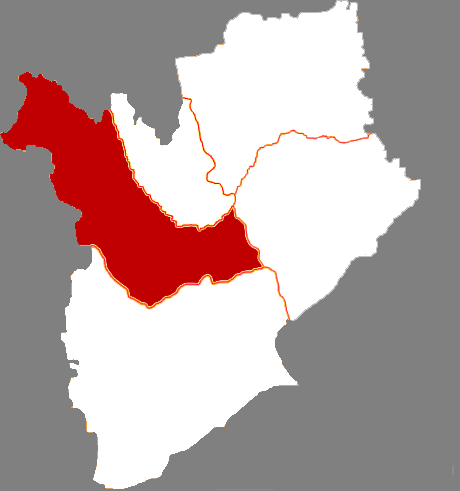

- Location in Jilin
- Coordinates: 45°20′N 122°47′E
- Country: People's Republic of China
- Province: Jilin
- Prefecture-level city: Baicheng

Area
  - County-level city: 5,103.0 km^{2} (1,970.3 sq mi)
  - Urban: 54.00 km^{2} (20.85 sq mi)
- Elevation: 149 m (489 ft)

Population (2017)
  - County-level city: 420,000
  - Density: 82/km^{2} (210/sq mi)
  - Urban: 115,399
- Time zone: UTC+8 (China Standard)

Taonan (Chinese: 洮南; pinyin: Táonán), formerly Tao'an County (洮安县), is a county-level city of 100,000 in the northwest of Jilin province in Northeast China. It is under the administration of Baicheng prefecture-level city.

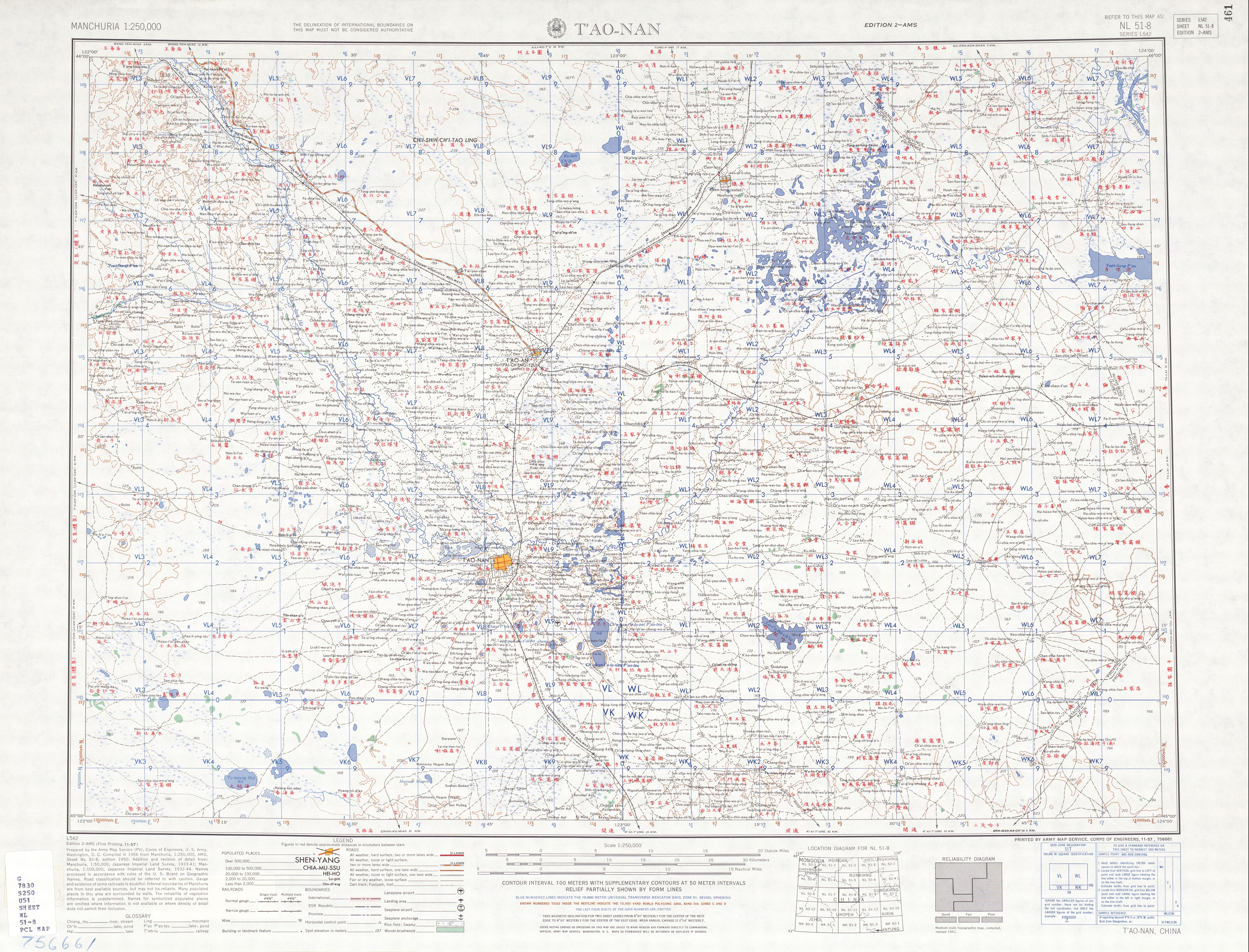
Map including Taonan (labeled as T'AO-NAN (walled) 洮南) (AMS, 1956)

== Administrative Divisions ==
There are 6 subdistricts, 5 towns, 14 townships, and 2 ethnic townships.

Subdistricts:

- Tuanjie Subdistrict (团结街道), Fuwen Subdistrict (富文街道), Guangming Subdistrict (光明街道), Xinglong Subdistrict (兴隆街道), Yongkang Subdistrict (永康街道), Tongda Subdistrict (通达街道)

Towns:

- Wafang (瓦房镇), Wanbao (万宝镇), Heishui (黑水镇), Najin (那金镇), Anding (安定镇)

Townships:

- Wanbao Township (万宝乡), Jubao Township (聚宝乡), Meiyao Township (煤窑乡), Dongsheng Township (东升乡), Yema Township (野马乡), Yongmao Township (永茂乡), Xingye Township (兴业乡), Jiaoliuhe Township (蛟流河乡), Datong Township (大通乡), Fushun Township (福顺乡), Xinfu Township (幸福乡), Erlong Township (二龙乡), Xiangyang Township (向阳乡), Taofu Township (洮府乡), Hulitu Mongol Ethnic Township (胡力吐蒙古族乡), Huhecheli Mongol Ethnic Township (呼和车力蒙古族乡)

== Climate ==
Climate data for Taonan, elevation 151 m (495 ft), (1991–2020 normals, extremes 1981–2010)
Month	Jan	Feb	Mar	Apr	May	Jun	Jul	Aug	Sep	Oct	Nov	Dec	Year
Record high °C (°F)	6.2 (43.2)	14.5 (58.1)	26.8 (80.2)	33.1 (91.6)	39.6 (103.3)	40.8 (105.4)	38.7 (101.7)	37.4 (99.3)	34.6 (94.3)	28.9 (84.0)	18.9 (66.0)	7.0 (44.6)	40.8 (105.4)
Mean daily maximum °C (°F)	−8.5 (16.7)	−2.8 (27.0)	5.6 (42.1)	15.7 (60.3)	23.2 (73.8)	27.9 (82.2)	29.5 (85.1)	28.0 (82.4)	23.0 (73.4)	13.8 (56.8)	1.6 (34.9)	−7.2 (19.0)	12.5 (54.5)
Daily mean °C (°F)	−14.8 (5.4)	−9.7 (14.5)	−1.2 (29.8)	8.8 (47.8)	16.7 (62.1)	22.1 (71.8)	24.5 (76.1)	22.6 (72.7)	16.4 (61.5)	7.3 (45.1)	−4.3 (24.3)	−12.9 (8.8)	6.3 (43.3)
Mean daily minimum °C (°F)	−19.8 (−3.6)	−15.6 (3.9)	−7.6 (18.3)	1.9 (35.4)	10.2 (50.4)	16.4 (61.5)	19.7 (67.5)	17.6 (63.7)	10.4 (50.7)	1.6 (34.9)	−9.0 (15.8)	−17.5 (0.5)	0.7 (33.3)
Record low °C (°F)	−34.6 (−30.3)	−32.1 (−25.8)	−20.0 (−4.0)	−9.0 (15.8)	−0.5 (31.1)	4.2 (39.6)	10.6 (51.1)	7.1 (44.8)	−0.4 (31.3)	−15.3 (4.5)	−23.0 (−9.4)	−31.2 (−24.2)	−34.6 (−30.3)
Average precipitation mm (inches)	1.2 (0.05)	2.2 (0.09)	5.0 (0.20)	15.7 (0.62)	36.7 (1.44)	86.9 (3.42)	96.1 (3.78)	75.0 (2.95)	34.3 (1.35)	13.3 (0.52)	4.8 (0.19)	3.4 (0.13)	374.6 (14.74)
Average precipitation days (≥ 0.1 mm)	2.6	1.5	3.0	4.0	7.5	11.5	11.2	9.3	6.7	4.1	3.2	3.4	68
Average snowy days	4.2	2.4	3.6	1.1	0	0	0	0	0	0.8	3.8	4.8	20.7
Average relative humidity (%)	57	47	40	37	44	57	68	70	59	51	54	59	54
Mean monthly sunshine hours	198.0	214.9	261.3	258.7	278.8	272.8	264.4	264.9	256.8	230.0	185.8	177.2	2,863.6
Percentage possible sunshine	70	73	70	64	60	58	57	62	69	69	66	66	65
Source: China Meteorological Administration
