= Da'an, Jilin =

Da'an 大安市
- County-level city
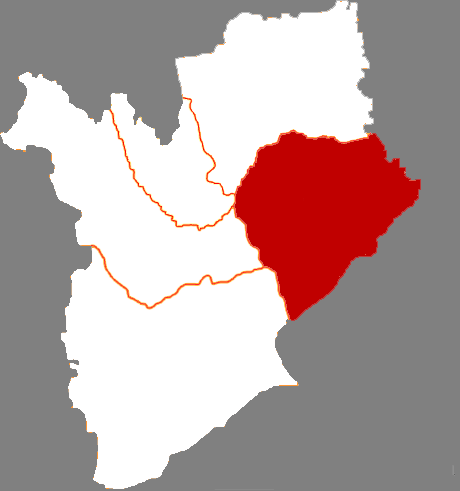
- Location of the city

- Location in Jilin
- Coordinates: 45°30′N 124°17′E
- Country: People's Republic of China
- Province: Jilin
- Prefecture-level city: Baicheng

Area
  - County-level city: 4,879.0 km^{2} (1,883.8 sq mi)
  - Urban: 200.00 km^{2} (77.22 sq mi)
- Elevation: 137 m (449 ft)

Population (2017)
  - County-level city: 438,000
  - Density: 89.8/km^{2} (233/sq mi)
  - Urban: 159,200
- Time zone: UTC+8 (China Standard)

Da'an (Chinese: 大安; pinyin: Dà'ān; lit. 'Dalai and Anchang') is a city of northwestern Jilin province in Northeast China, on the southern bank of the Songhua River and the border with Heilongjiang province. It is under the administration of Baicheng City, 115 kilometres (71 mi) to the west, and lies 57 kilometres (35 mi) northwest of Songyuan. Da'an City is 423,700, including 423,000 permanent residents.

== Administrative divisions ==
There are five subdistricts, 10 towns, 16 townships, and one ethnic township.

Subdistricts:

- Anbei Subdistrict (安北街道), Jinhua Subdistrict (锦华街道), Linjiang Subdistrict (临江街道), Huiyang Subdistrict (慧阳街道), Changhong Subdistrict (长虹街道)

Towns:

- Yueliangpao (月亮泡镇), Anchang (安广镇), Fengshou (丰收镇), Xinping'an (新平安镇), Liangjiazi (两家子镇), Sheli (舍力镇), Dagangzi (大岗子镇), Chagan (叉干镇), Longzhao (龙沼镇)

Townships:

- Sikeshu Township (四棵树乡), Lianhe Township (联合乡), Taishan Township (太山乡), Sidawa Township (西大洼乡), Lesheng Township (乐胜乡), Xinhuang Township (新荒乡), Dalai Township (大赉乡), Honggangzi Township (红岗子乡), Tongjian Township (同建乡), Laifu Township (来福乡), Liuhe Township (六合乡), Gucheng Township (古城乡), Shaoguozhen Township (烧锅镇乡), Dayushu Township (大榆树乡), Haituo Township (海坨乡), Jingshan Township (静山乡), Xin'aili Mongol Ethnic Township (新艾里蒙古族乡)

== Climate ==
Climate data for Da'an, elevation 138 m (453 ft), (1991–2020 normals, extremes 1981–2010)
Month	Jan	Feb	Mar	Apr	May	Jun	Jul	Aug	Sep	Oct	Nov	Dec	Year
Record high °C (°F)	3.2 (37.8)	12.9 (55.2)	21.1 (70.0)	32.0 (89.6)	36.8 (98.2)	39.0 (102.2)	37.5 (99.5)	36.4 (97.5)	33.2 (91.8)	27.6 (81.7)	17.5 (63.5)	8.3 (46.9)	39.0 (102.2)
Mean daily maximum °C (°F)	−10.6 (12.9)	−4.6 (23.7)	4.2 (39.6)	14.6 (58.3)	22.2 (72.0)	27.1 (80.8)	28.5 (83.3)	27.0 (80.6)	22.1 (71.8)	12.9 (55.2)	0.5 (32.9)	−8.9 (16.0)	11.3 (52.3)
Daily mean °C (°F)	−16.8 (1.8)	−11.3 (11.7)	−2.1 (28.2)	8.1 (46.6)	16.1 (61.0)	21.7 (71.1)	24.0 (75.2)	22.2 (72.0)	16.0 (60.8)	6.9 (44.4)	−4.8 (23.4)	−14.4 (6.1)	5.5 (41.9)
Mean daily minimum °C (°F)	−21.7 (−7.1)	−17.1 (1.2)	−8.1 (17.4)	1.6 (34.9)	10.1 (50.2)	16.3 (61.3)	19.5 (67.1)	17.6 (63.7)	10.3 (50.5)	1.6 (34.9)	−9.4 (15.1)	−19.0 (−2.2)	0.1 (32.3)
Record low °C (°F)	−37.3 (−35.1)	−36.4 (−33.5)	−23.6 (−10.5)	−8.9 (16.0)	−1.6 (29.1)	4.7 (40.5)	10.6 (51.1)	7.3 (45.1)	−2.1 (28.2)	−17.5 (0.5)	−25.3 (−13.5)	−33.9 (−29.0)	−37.3 (−35.1)
Average precipitation mm (inches)	2.3 (0.09)	2.5 (0.10)	5.7 (0.22)	13.2 (0.52)	43.9 (1.73)	80.2 (3.16)	122.7 (4.83)	100.6 (3.96)	43.0 (1.69)	16.8 (0.66)	7.4 (0.29)	4.6 (0.18)	442.9 (17.43)
Average precipitation days (≥ 0.1 mm)	3.0	2.1	3.7	4.4	8.6	11.4	12.5	10.1	7.6	4.9	3.7	4.6	76.6
Average snowy days	5.0	3.3	4.7	1.4	0.1	0	0	0	0	1.3	4.8	6.5	27.1
Average relative humidity (%)	65	57	48	44	49	62	74	75	66	58	61	66	60
Mean monthly sunshine hours	195.0	216.1	256.7	256.6	276.2	268.8	260.2	256.7	253.2	223.8	182.0	172.6	2,817.9
Percentage possible sunshine	69	73	69	63	60	58	55	60	68	67	65	64	64
Source: China Meteorological Administration Da'an City is 423,700, including 423,000 permanent residents.

== History ==
The original name of Da'an is Mole Honggangzi. In the early Qing Dynasty, it was under the jurisdiction of General Shengjing.

At the end of World War II the Soviets invaded Japanese-held Manchuria. After they withdrew from Manchuria in 1946, control of Dalai County alternated between the Communists and Nationalists, the final liberation being in January 1949. Neighbouring Anguang county remained in Communist control after liberation in February 1946. In 1958 Dalai County was merged with Anguang County and the names merged to create Da'an County.

In 1988, Da'an became a county-level city.
