= Baicheng =

Baicheng 白城市
- Prefecture-level city
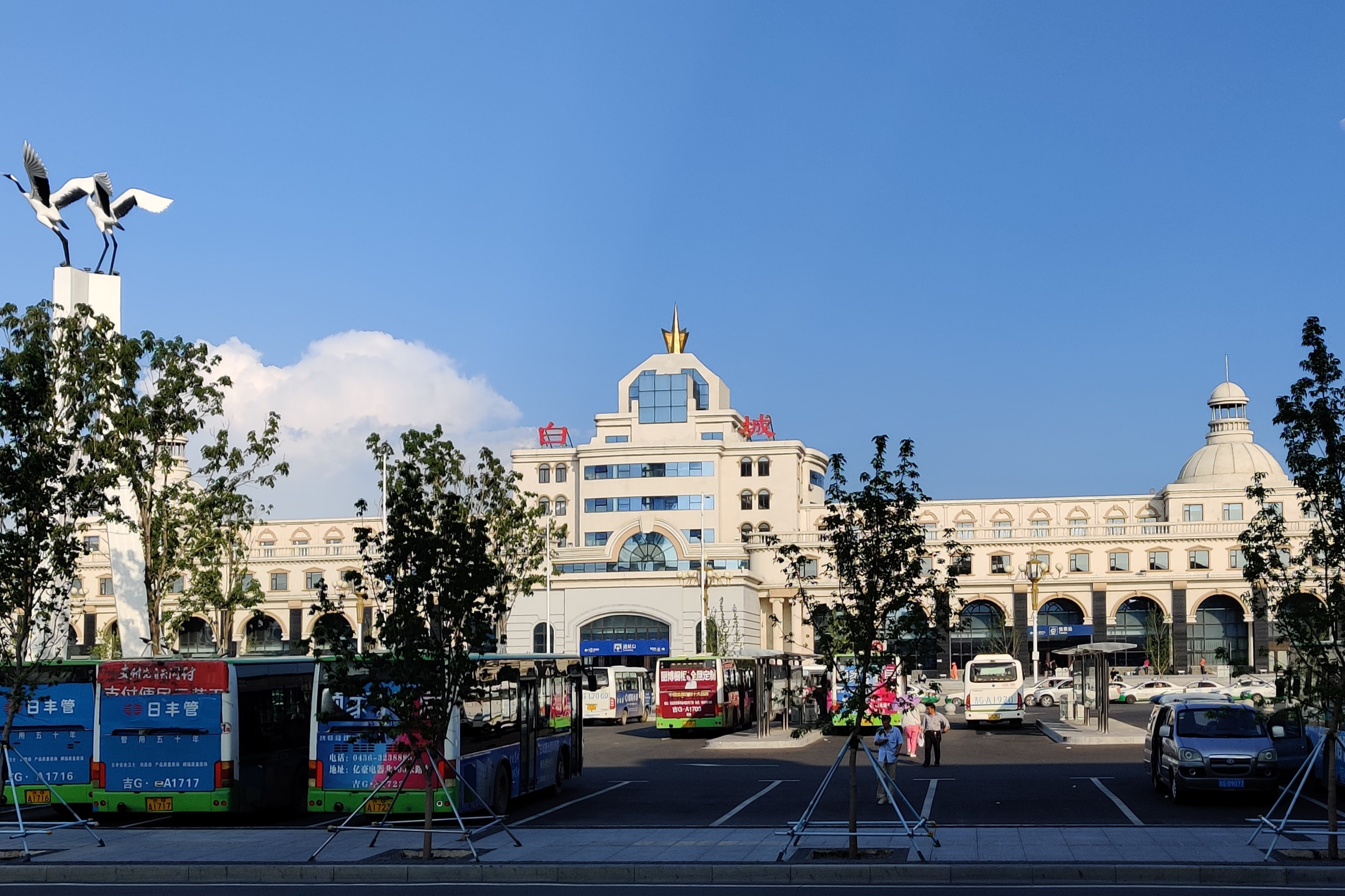
- Baicheng Railway Station

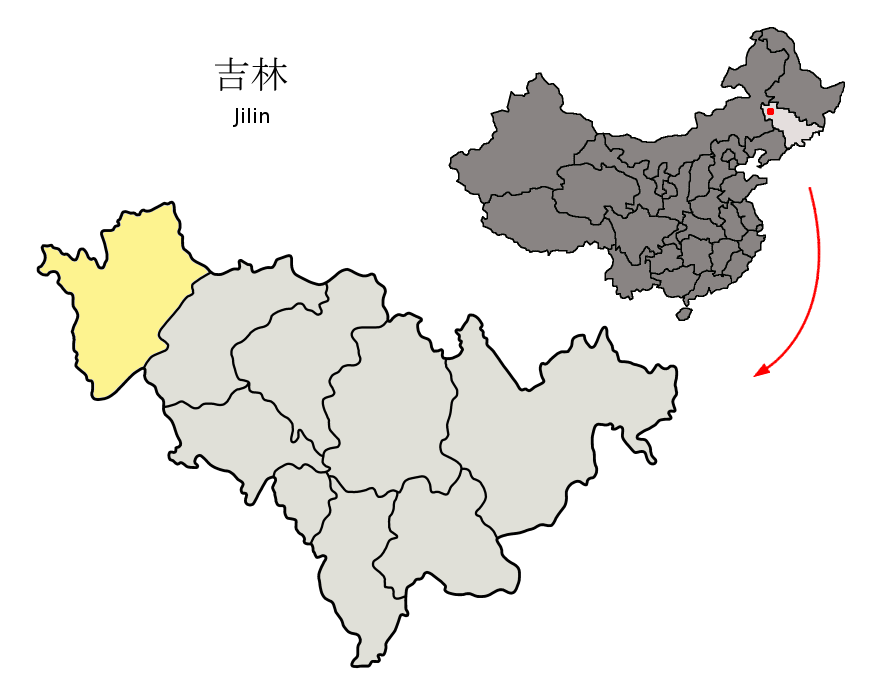
- Location of Baicheng City (yellow) in Jilin (light grey)

- Location of the city centre in Jilin
- Coordinates (Baicheng municipal government): 45°37′12″N 122°50′17″E
- Country: People's Republic of China
- Province: Jilin
- Incorporated (town): 1915
- Incorporated (city): 1958
- City seat: Taobei District
- County-level divisions: 5

Government
  - Type: Prefecture-level city
  - CPC Baicheng Secretary: Li Jinxiu (李晋修)
  - Mayor: An Guiwu (安桂武)

Area
  - Prefecture-level city: 25,683 km^{2} (9,916 sq mi)
  - Urban (2017): 67.50 km^{2} (26.06 sq mi)
  - Districts: 2,568.8 km^{2} (991.8 sq mi)
- Elevation: 154 m (505 ft)

Population (2010)
  - Prefecture-level city: 2,033,058
  - Density: 79.160/km^{2} (205.02/sq mi)
  - Urban (2020): 332,826
  - Districts: 508,000

GDP
  - Prefecture-level city: CN¥ 70 billion US$ 11.2 billion
  - Per capita: CN¥ 35,479; US$ 5,696
- Time zone: UTC+8 (China Standard)
- Postal code: 137000
- Area code: 0436
- ISO 3166 code: CN-JL-08
- Licence plates: 吉G
- Website: www.bc.jl.gov.cn

Baicheng (Chinese: 白城市; pinyin: Báichéng Shì; lit. 'White City') is a prefecture-level city in the northwestern part of Jilin province, China, bordering Inner Mongolia to the north and west and Heilongjiang to the east and northeast. At the 2010 census, 2,033,058 people lived within its administrative area of 25,683 km^{2} (9,916 sq mi).

== Toponymy ==
By 1938 the area was renamed to Baicheng, which in Chinese means white town. The name's origin is the Mongolian name of the city Chaghanhot, which also means "white town".

== History ==
The area of present-day Baicheng has been inhabited by humans for more than 12,000 years, dating back to the Upper Paleolithic era. The area was subsequently inhabited by the nomadic Donghu from the period of the Shang dynasty through to the Qin dynasty. It would later be inhabited by the Xianbei and formed part of Buyeo from the period of the Han dynasty through to the Northern and Southern dynasties. During the time of the Sui dynasty and Tang dynasty, the area was inhabited by the Khitan people.

During the Khitan-founded Liao dynasty, the area was incorporated as part of the Changchun Prefecture, the seat of which was located in the ancient city of Chengsijiazi (Chinese: 城四家子; pinyin: Chéngsìjiāzǐ), located in present-day Deshun Mongol Ethnic Township in Taobei District. Four emperors of the Liao dynasty were based out of Changchun Prefecture: Emperor Shengzong, Emperor Xingzong, Emperor Daozong, and Emperor Tianzuo. During this time, the area was a major political, military, economic, and cultural center of the Liao Dynasty.

During the Jin dynasty, Changchun Prefecture remained intact until 1150, when it was reorganized as Changchun County (Chinese: 长春县; pinyin: Chángchūn Xiàn), which was placed under the jurisdiction of Zhao Prefecture. In 1198, the area was re-organized as Tai Prefecture, the seat of which was located in Chengsijiazi.

During the Yuan dynasty, the area was first a fief of Genghis Khan's younger brother Temüge. Later, it was organized as Taining Circuit, which was still based out of Chengsijiazi.

During the Ming dynasty, Taining Circuit reorganized as Taining Guard, and was part of the Nurgan Regional Military Commission briefly used to administer Manchuria.

During the Qing dynasty, the area belonged to the Khorchin Mongols. As Qing government forbade the settlement of Han Chinese in the 19th century, no farming was allowed until 1902. In 1902, under the reign of Emperor Guangxu, the Qing government approved the opening of the area to settlement. In 1904, Taonan Fu was established in the area, which was under the jurisdiction of the Shengjing General. In the same year, Kaitong County (Chinese: 开通县; pinyin: Kāitōng Xiàn) and Jing'an County (Chinese: 靖安县; pinyin: Jìng'ān Xiàn) were established within Taonan Fu. In 1905, Anguang County (Chinese: 安广县; pinyin: Ānguǎng Xiàn) was established as part of Taonan Fu. In December 1905, Dalai Ting (Chinese: 大赉厅; pinyin: Dàlài Tīng) was established in the area, and put under the jurisdiction of the Heilongjiang General.

In 1907, the northeast portion of the Qing dynasty was reorganized into provinces, and positions of the Shangjing General and the Heilongjiang General, which were responsible for the area's administration, were merged into the Viceroy of the Three Eastern Provinces. Taonan Fu, including Kaitong County, Jing'an County, and Anguang County were under the jurisdiction of Fengtian province. Dalai Ting was placed under the jurisdiction of Heilongjiang province. In 1910, Zhendong County (Chinese: 镇东县; pinyin: Zhèndōng Xiàn) was established in the area, and placed under the jurisdiction of Fengtian province. In 1913, the area's administrative divisions were reorganized, and the area was split between Taochang Circuit in Fengtian province, and Longjiang Circuit in Heilongjiang province. In 1914 Jing'an County was renamed Tao'an (洮南). In 1915, Zhanyu County was established in Taochang Circuit.

Baicheng's importance started to increase after a railway from Qiqihar to Siping through Baicheng was constructed in the 1920s. In the 1930s another railway connecting Baicheng to Ulanhot and the mines at Arxan was opened northwestward. These two lines enabled Baicheng to become a regional transportation hub in western Jilin province. One more rail line connecting Changchun was opened in the mid-1930s as well.

During the Second Sino-Japanese War, the entire area was brought under the control of Longjiang province (Chinese: 龙江省; pinyin: Lóngjiāng shěng), part of Manchukuo. By 1938 the area was renamed to Baicheng, which in Chinese means white town. The name's origin is the Mongolian name of the city Chaghanhot, which also means "white town".

After the liberation of the area from Japanese forces on August 15, 1945, all counties in the area were placed under the jurisdiction of Nenjiang province. In 1946, Communist forces took the area, and it was placed under the jurisdiction of Nenjiang province and Liaoji province. The following year, the area was reorganized as part of Liaobei province. In 1949, it was moved back to Heilongjiang province. The area was moved again to Jilin province in 1954. In August of that year, the area was reorganized as Baichengzi zone (Chinese: 白城子专区; pinyin: Báichéngzǐ zhuānqū). The following year, it was renamed to Baicheng. From the late 1950s throughout the late 1970s, the area of Baicheng was modified multiple times, as were its internal borders. In July 1987, Tao'an County was reorganized as Taonan, a county-level city, which it remains today. In November 1988, Da'an County was also reorganized to be a county-level city, which it remains today. Baicheng underwent multiple more border changes in the early 1990s. In August 1993, it was reorganized as a prefecture-level city, which it remains today.

== Geography ==
Situated in the northwestern part of Jilin province, Baicheng is located in the western portion of the Songnen Plain, and in the eastern part of the Horqin Grassland. The city stretches from a latitude of 44° 13′ to 46° 18′ N, and a longitude of 121° 38′ to 124° 22' E. At its greatest width, the city spans 230 kilometres (142.9 mi) from north to south and 211 kilometres (131 mi) from east to west. The total area of the city is 25,758.73 square kilometres (9,945.50 sq mi), occupying 13.7% of the provincial area. The eastern part of the Greater Khingan Mountains lies in the northwest of Baicheng. Grassland and wetlands are prominent throughout the city's southeastern part.

Baicheng is bordered by Songyuan to its east and southeast. It is bordered by Horqin Right Middle Banner, Tuquan County, and Horqin Right Front Banner in Hinggan League in Inner Mongolia to the west and northwest. To its north and northeast, Baicheng is bordered by Tailai County in Qiqihar, as well as Dorbod Mongol Autonomous County and Zhaoyuan County in Daqing, all in the province of Heilongjiang.

The city's metro area is located 333 kilometres (207 mi) from the provincial capital of Changchun, 218 kilometres (135 mi) from Qiqihar, 448 kilometres (278 mi) from Siping, and 83 kilometres (52 mi) from Ulanhot.

=== Climate ===
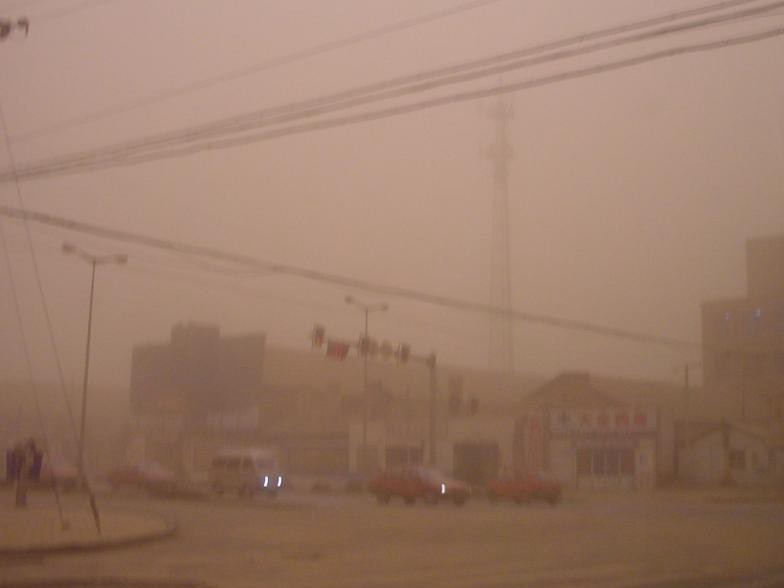
A dust storm in Baicheng in 2001

Baicheng has a rather dry, monsoon-influenced, humid continental climate (Köppen Dwa), with long (lasting from November to March), very cold, windy, but dry winters due to the influence of the Siberian high, and hot, humid summers, due to the East Asian monsoon. The coldest month, January, averages −16.1 °C (3.0 °F), while the warmest month, July, averages 23.5 °C (74.3 °F); the annual mean is 5.5 °C (41.9 °F). More than 70% of the annual precipitation falls from June to August alone. Drought conditions are common in spring and autumn; from 1961 to 2009, there were 31 years with spring drought and 28 with autumn drought.

Climate data for Baicheng, elevation 155 m (509 ft), (1991–2020 normals, extremes 1971–present)
Month	Jan	Feb	Mar	Apr	May	Jun	Jul	Aug	Sep	Oct	Nov	Dec	Year
Record high °C (°F)	5.9 (42.6)	12.8 (55.0)	26.6 (79.9)	33.3 (91.9)	40.0 (104.0)	40.7 (105.3)	38.7 (101.7)	37.7 (99.9)	34.0 (93.2)	29.8 (85.6)	19.3 (66.7)	7.2 (45.0)	40.7 (105.3)
Mean daily maximum °C (°F)	−8.8 (16.2)	−3.0 (26.6)	5.4 (41.7)	15.6 (60.1)	23.1 (73.6)	27.7 (81.9)	29.2 (84.6)	27.7 (81.9)	22.7 (72.9)	13.7 (56.7)	1.3 (34.3)	−7.5 (18.5)	12.3 (54.1)
Daily mean °C (°F)	−15.7 (3.7)	−10.3 (13.5)	−1.6 (29.1)	8.6 (47.5)	16.6 (61.9)	21.8 (71.2)	24.0 (75.2)	22.0 (71.6)	15.9 (60.6)	6.9 (44.4)	−4.8 (23.4)	−13.7 (7.3)	5.8 (42.4)
Mean daily minimum °C (°F)	−21.4 (−6.5)	−16.9 (1.6)	−8.6 (16.5)	1.1 (34.0)	9.6 (49.3)	15.8 (60.4)	19.0 (66.2)	16.6 (61.9)	9.3 (48.7)	0.8 (33.4)	−10.1 (13.8)	−18.9 (−2.0)	−0.3 (31.4)
Record low °C (°F)	−38.1 (−36.6)	−36.7 (−34.1)	−26.0 (−14.8)	−13.6 (7.5)	−4.4 (24.1)	3.7 (38.7)	8.0 (46.4)	6.6 (43.9)	−2.9 (26.8)	−19.6 (−3.3)	−29.3 (−20.7)	−35.1 (−31.2)	−38.1 (−36.6)
Average precipitation mm (inches)	1.0 (0.04)	2.0 (0.08)	4.2 (0.17)	16.0 (0.63)	38.0 (1.50)	81.9 (3.22)	105.3 (4.15)	70.2 (2.76)	44.0 (1.73)	12.9 (0.51)	4.2 (0.17)	2.7 (0.11)	382.4 (15.07)
Average precipitation days (≥ 0.1 mm)	2.1	1.6	2.7	3.9	7.4	11.6	11.6	9.3	6.6	4.0	3.1	3.4	67.3
Average snowy days	4.1	2.9	4.0	1.2	0	0	0	0	0	1.0	4.0	5.1	22.3
Average relative humidity (%)	58	48	40	37	45	59	73	73	62	52	54	59	55
Mean monthly sunshine hours	212.4	229.0	272.9	264.2	266.0	249.1	240.5	247.1	246.9	227.2	190.8	187.0	2,833.1
Percentage possible sunshine	75	78	73	65	58	53	51	57	67	68	68	69	65
Source 1: China Meteorological Administration all-time July high
Source 2: Weather China

== Administrative divisions ==
Baicheng directly administers one district, two counties, and two county-level cities. These county-level divisions then in turn administer 31 subdistricts, 38 towns, and 35 townships (including 8 ethnic townships).

Map
#	Name	Hanzi	Hanyu Pinyin	Population (2003 est.)	Area (km^{2})	Density (/km^{2})
1	Taobei District	洮北区	Táoběi Qū	490,000	2,525	194
2	Da'an City	大安市	Dà'ān Shì	420,000	4,879	86
3	Taonan City	洮南市	Táonán Shì	440,000	5,108	86
4	Zhenlai County	镇赉县	Zhènlài Xiàn	310,000	4,695	66
5	Tongyu County	通榆县	Tōngyú Xiàn	350,000	8,476	41

== Demographics ==
Per a 2023 government publication, 93.65% of Baicheng is ethnically Han Chinese. Of the remaining 6.35%, the largest ethnic minorities in the city include the Mongols (3.51%), the Manchu (1.92%), Koreans (0.58%), and the Hui (0.21%). As of 2023, Baicheng has eight ethnic townships under its jurisdiction: Deshun Mongol Ethnic Township in Taobei District, Xin'aili Mongol Ethnic Township in Da'an, Hulitu Mongol Ethnic Township and Huhecheli Mongol Ethnic Township in Taonan, Momoge Mongol Ethnic Township and Hatuqi Mongol Ethnic Township in Zhenlai County, and Xianghai Mongol Ethnic Township and Baolawendu Mongol Ethnic Township in Tongyu County.

43.3% of Baicheng's population lived in urban areas as of 2022.

As of 2022, 50.2% of Baicheng's population is male, and 49.8% is female.

== Economy ==
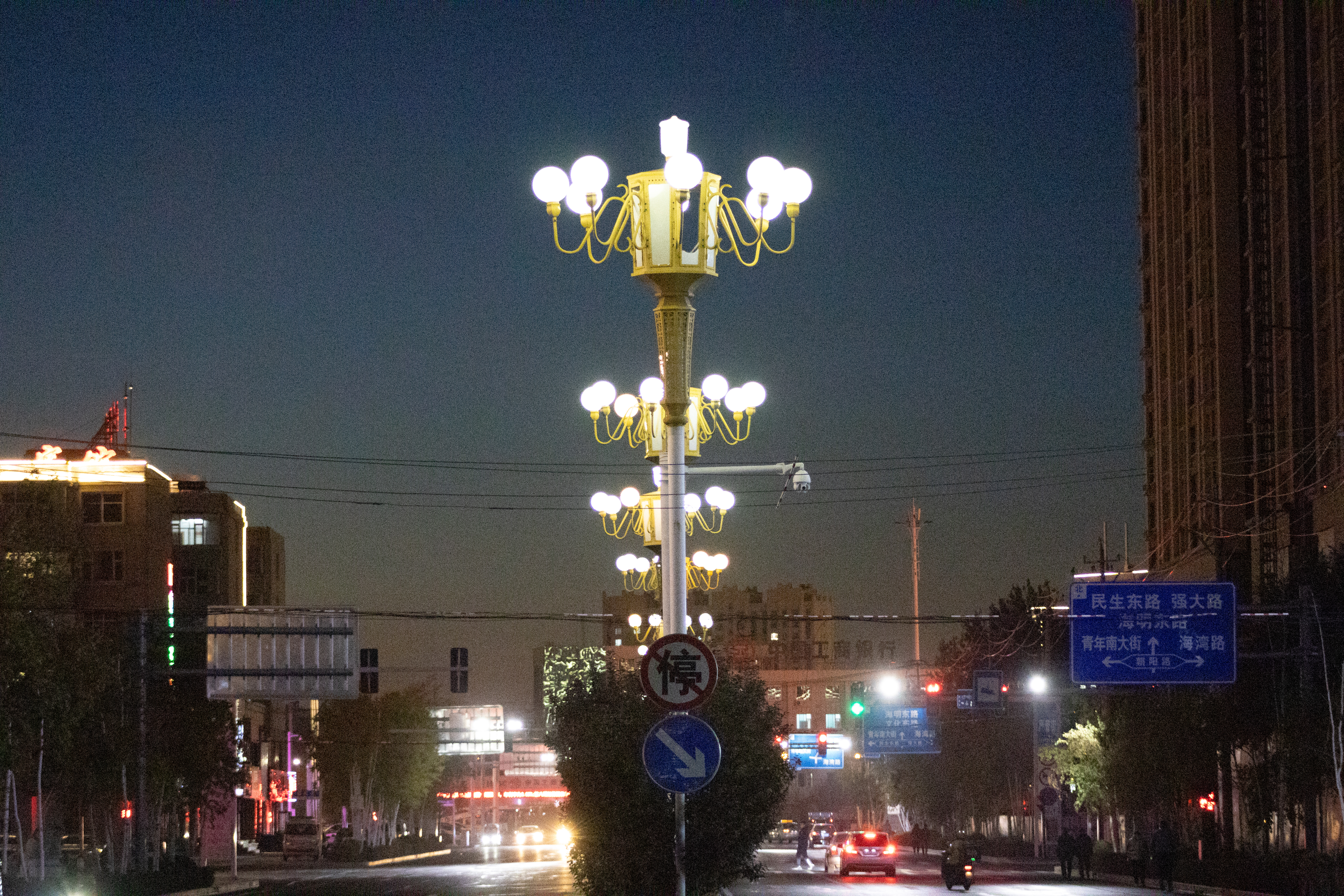
A night view of Baicheng

As of 2022, Baicheng's gross domestic product (GDP) totaled 57.486 billion renminbi (RMB). Its primary sector accounted for 29.2% of its GDP, while its secondary sector accounted for 18.9%, and its tertiary sector accounted for 51.9%. The per capita disposable income of urban residents in the city was 29,109 RMB, an increase of 2.4% over the previous year, while the per capita disposable income of rural residents in the city was 14,282 RMB, an increase of 5.7% over the previous year.

The total output of the city's agriculture, forestry, animal husbandry, and fishery industries totaled 31.577 billion RMB in 2022. Major crops grown in Baicheng include maize, rice, various beans, and oilseeds.

Textile industry is one of the main pillars of the economy. It is home to the Baicheng Weapons Test Centre.

The total retail sales of consumer goods in Baicheng totaled 15.319 billion RMB in 2022.

Baicheng was home to 3.203 billion RMB-worth of foreign trade in 2022.

== Transportation ==
=== Railway ===
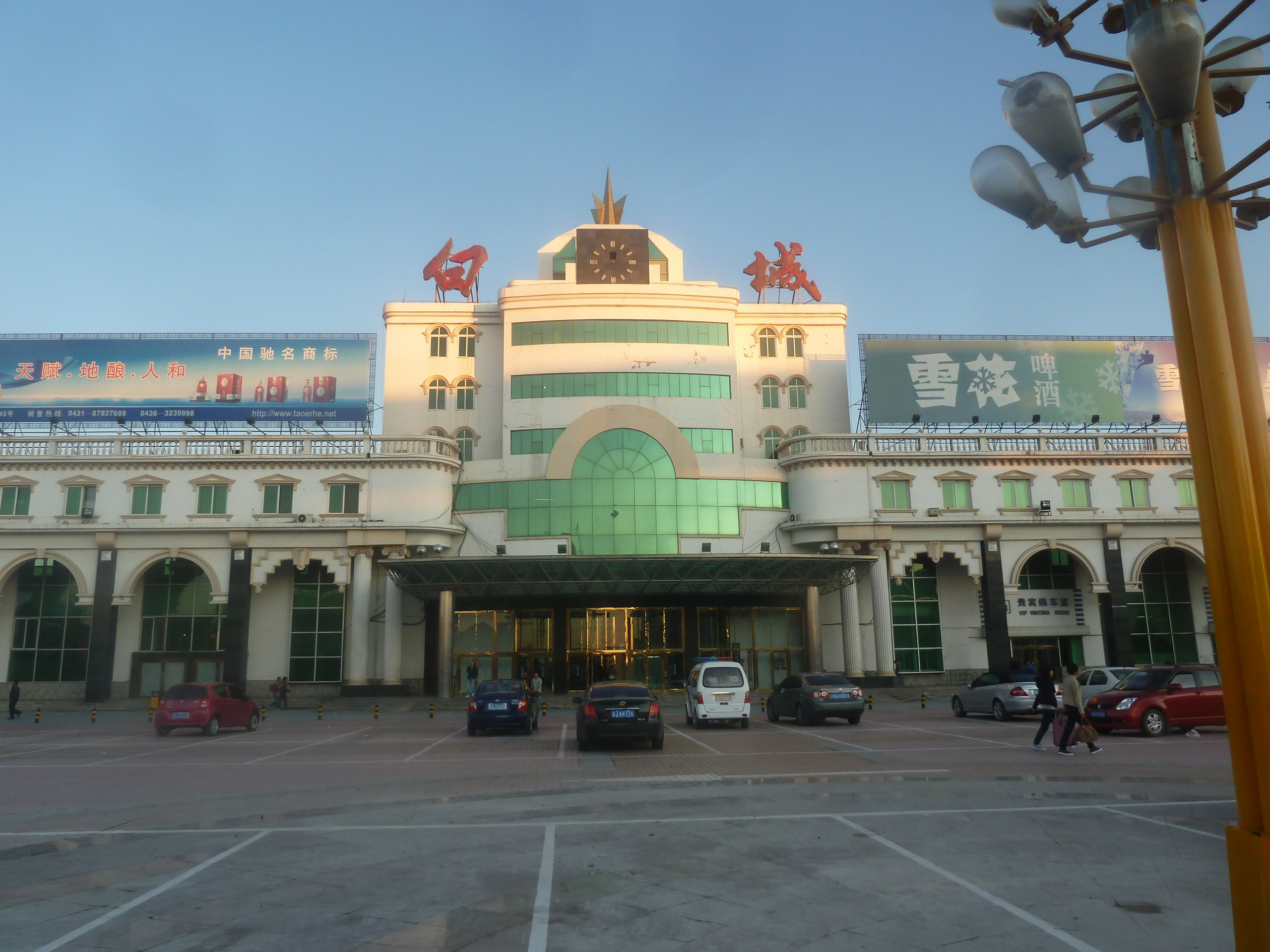
Baicheng Railway Station

Baicheng railway station is a railway hub in western Jilin Province. It is the terminus of the Changchun–Baicheng railway. There are multiple daily departures to other cities including Beijing, Harbin, Changchun, Shenyang, Dalian, Qiqihar, Ulanhot and several other cities in northern provinces of China.

=== Road ===
Expressways

- G4512 Shuangliao–Nenjiang Expressway
- G12 Hunchun–Ulanhot Expressway

National highways (GXXX):

- China National Highway 302

=== Air ===
Baicheng Chang'an Airport is located in the town of Taohe (洮河) in Taobei District, 16.5 kilometres (10.3 mi) from the city center. It has been under construction since October 26, 2012. The total investment is 480 million yuan. The airport was opened on 31 March 2017, the fifth civil airport in Jilin province. The airport has a runway that is 2,500 meters long and 45 meters wide (class 4C), and a 4,471-square-meter terminal building. It is designed to handle 200,000 passengers and 700 tons of cargo annually by 2020.

== Culture ==
As of 2022, Baicheng has one art gallery, five cultural centers, six museums, and six public libraries. The city has seven radio stations and six television channels.

== Healthcare ==
As of 2022, the city has 1,947 medical institutions, including 49 hospitals, 6 maternal and child health care institutions, 5 specialized disease prevention and treatment institutions, 6 disease prevention and control centers, 11 community service centers, 92 township health centers, and 847 clinics, health centers, medical offices, and nursing stations. At the end of the year, Baicheng's health institutions had 9,248 beds, of which, 8,980 were located in hospitals and health centers. The city has 13,340 healthcare professionals, including 5,508 practicing assistant doctors, 4,397 practicing doctors, and 5,869 registered nurses.

== Sister cities ==
- Barnaul, Altai Krai, Russia
