= Jilin =

Province in Northeast China

Jilin 吉林 Chi-lin, Kirin
- Province

Name transcription(s)
  - Chinese: 吉林省 (Jílín Shěng)
  - Abbreviation: JL / 吉 (pinyin: Jí)
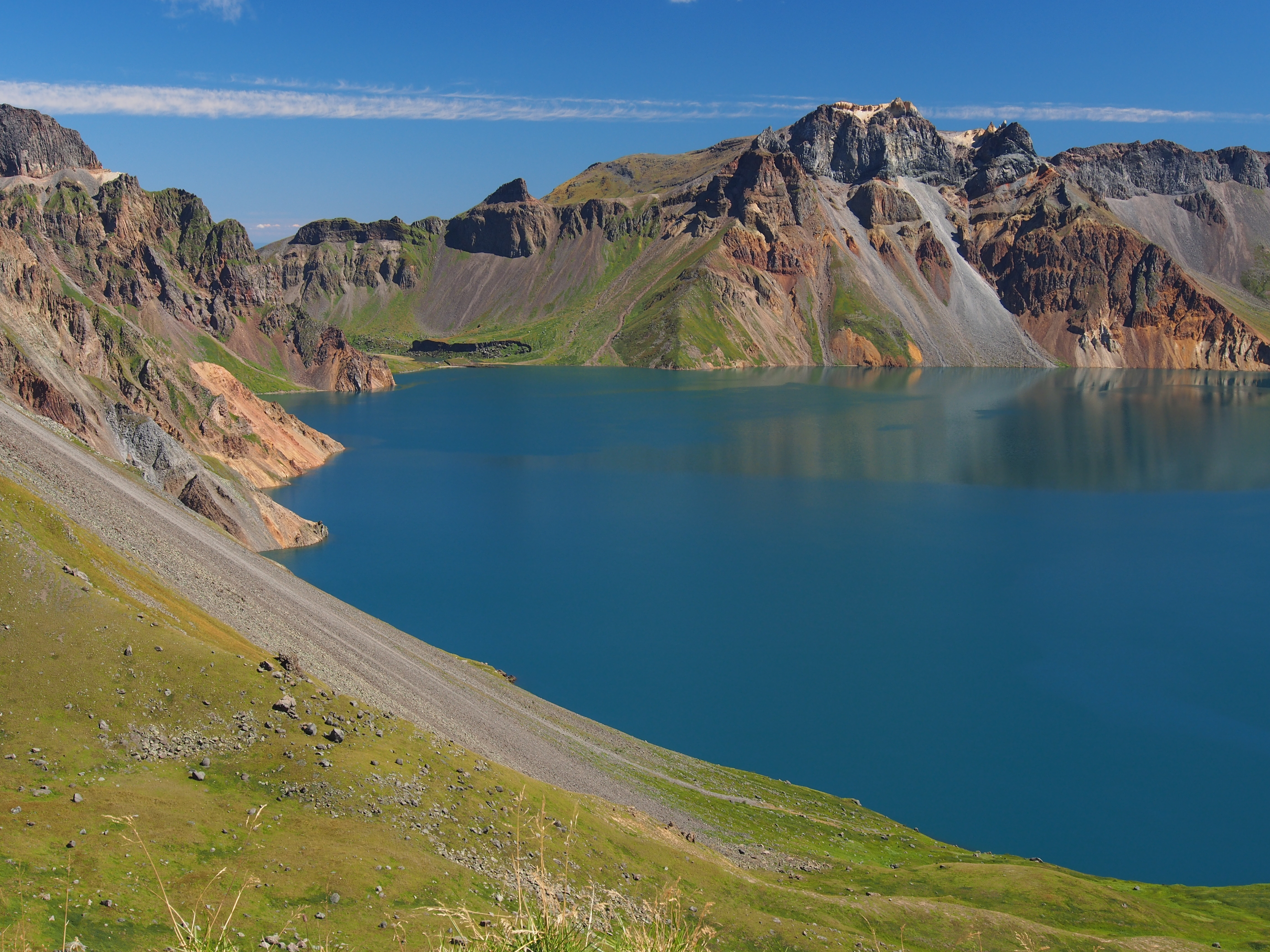
- View of Heaven Lake

- Map showing the location of Jilin Province
- Coordinates: 43°42′N 126°12′E
- Country: China
- Named for: from girin ula, a Manchu phrase meaning "along the river"
- Capital (and largest city): Changchun Jilin (1949–1954); Changchun (1954–present)
- Divisions: 9 prefectures, 60 counties, 1006 townships

Government
  - Type: Province
  - Body: Jilin Provincial People's Congress
  - Party Secretary: Huang Qiang
  - Congress chairman: vacant
  - Governor: Hu Yuting
  - CPPCC chairman: Zhu Guoxian
  - National People's Congress Representation: 60 deputies

Area
  - Total: 191,126 km^{2} (73,794 sq mi)
  - Rank: 14th
- Highest elevation (Mount Paektu): 2,744 m (9,003 ft)

Population (2020)
  - Total: 24,073,453
  - Rank: 24th
  - Density: 125.956/km^{2} (326.224/sq mi)
  - Rank: 23rd

Demographics
  - Ethnic composition: Han: 91%; Korean: 4%; Manchu: 4%; Mongol: 0.6%; Hui: 0.5%
  - Languages and dialects: Northeastern Mandarin, Hamgyŏng Korean

GDP (2025)
  - Total: CN¥ 1,497 billion (26th); US$ 210 billion
  - Per capita: CN¥ 64,618 (27th); US$ 9,046
- ISO 3166 code: CN-JL
- HDI (2023): 0.787 (17th) – high
- Website: www.jl.gov.cn

Jilin
- "Jilin" in Chinese characters

Chinese name
- Chinese: 吉林
- Postal: Kirin
- Literal meaning: transcription of "girin (ula)" a Manchu phrase meaning "along the river"
Transcriptions
Standard Mandarin
- Hanyu Pinyin: Jílín
- Bopomofo: ㄐㄧˊ ㄌㄧㄣˊ
- Gwoyeu Romatzyh: Jyilin
- Wade–Giles: Chi^{2}-lin^{2}
- IPA: [tɕǐ.lǐn]
Yue: Cantonese
- Jyutping: Gat1 lam4

Chinese Korean name
- Chosŏn'gŭl: 길림
Transcriptions
- Revised Romanization: Gillim
- McCune–Reischauer: Killim

Manchu name
- Manchu script: ᡤᡳᡵᡳᠨ ᡤᠣᠯᠣ
- Romanization: Girin golo

Jilin (Note: /dʒiːˈlɪn/; 吉林; alternately romanized as Kirin or Chilin) is one of the three provinces of Northeast China. Its capital and largest city is Changchun. Jilin borders North Korea (Rasŏn, North Hamgyong, Ryanggang and Chagang) to the south, Russia (Primorsky Krai) to the east, Heilongjiang to the north, and Liaoning and Inner Mongolia to the west.

Along with the rest of Northeast China, Jilin underwent an early period of industrialization. However, Jilin's economy, characterized by heavy industry, has been facing economic difficulties with privatization. This prompted the central government to undertake a campaign called "Revitalize the Northeast". The region contains large deposits of oil shale.

== Name ==
The name "Jilin" originates from girin ula, (Note: ( ) ᡤᡳᡵᡳᠨ ᡠᠯᠠ) a Manchu phrase meaning "along the river", shortened to Kirin in English. This Manchu term was transcribed into jilin wula (t 吉林烏拉, s 吉林乌拉) in Chinese characters and shortened the first two characters, which are transcribed in English as Chi-lin (Wade-Giles) and later "Jilin" (Hanyu Pinyin).

== History ==
In ancient times, Jilin was inhabited by the Xianbei, Sushen, the Mohe, Jurchens, and the Wùjí (勿吉). The kingdoms of Buyeo and Goguryeo ruled parts of this area.

The region then fell successively under the domination of the Xiongnu, Xianbei state, Goguryeo, Balhae, Khitan Liao dynasty, the Jurchen Jin dynasty, and the Mongol Yuan dynasty. During the Qing dynasty, much of the area was under the control of the General of Jilin (Girin i Jiyanggiyūn), whose area of control extended to encompass much of what is Russia's Primorsky Krai today.

After the Primorsky Krai area was ceded to Russia in 1860, the government began to open the area up to Han Chinese migrants, most of whom came from Shandong. By the beginning of the 20th century, Han Chinese had become the dominant ethnic group of the region. In 1932, the area was incorporated into Manchukuo, a puppet state set up by Japan. Changchun (then called Xinjing), capital of Jilin today, was made the capital of Manchukuo. After the defeat of Japan in 1945, the Red Army captured Jilin after Operation August Storm. The region, with the rest of northeastern China, was ceded to the Communists by the Soviet Union. Manchuria was the staging ground from which the communists eventually conquered the rest of China in the Chinese Civil War.

In 1949, Jilin province was smaller, encompassing only the environs of Changchun and Jilin City, and the capital was at Jilin City, while Changchun was a municipality independent from the province. In the 1950s, Jilin was expanded to its present borders. During the Cultural Revolution, Jilin was expanded again to include a part of Inner Mongolia, giving it a border with the independent state of Mongolia, though this was later reversed.

In recent times Jilin has, with the rest of heavy industry-based Northeast China, been facing economic difficulties with privatization. This prompted the central government to undertake a campaign called "Revitalize the Northeast".

== Geography ==
Jilin lies in the central part of northeastern China, bordering Russia and North Korea in the east and southeast respectively. Jilin has an area of 190,000 km^{2} (73,000 sq mi) and a population of 24 million. Its capital is Changchun, which lies 113 km (70 mi) west of Jilin City. Jilin is rich in natural mineral deposits with 136 types of minerals, of which 70 have been extracted. Jilin has an abundance of Traditional Chinese medicine resources, with approximately 27,000 kinds of wild plants and 9,000 kinds of medicinal herbs.

The province is rich in large reserves of oil, gas, coal, iron, nickel, molybdenum, talc, graphite, gypsum, cement rock, gold and silver; its reserves of oil shale are the largest in the country.

Jilin is highest in altitude in the southeast and drops gently towards the northwest. The Changbai Mountains run through its southeastern regions and contains the highest peak of the province, Paektu Mountain at 2,744 m (9,003 ft). Other ranges include the Jilinhada Mountains, Zhang Guangcai Mountains, and Longgang Mountains.

Jilin is drained by the Yalu and Tumen rivers in the extreme southeast (which together form parts of the border between the People's Republic of China and North Korea), by tributaries of the Liao River in the southwest, and by the Songhua and Nen rivers in the north, both eventually flowing into the Amur.

Jilin has a northerly continental monsoon climate, with long, cold winters and short, warm summers. Average January temperatures range from −20 to −14 °C (−4 to 7 °F). Rainfall averages at 350 to 1,000 mm (13.8 to 39.4 in).

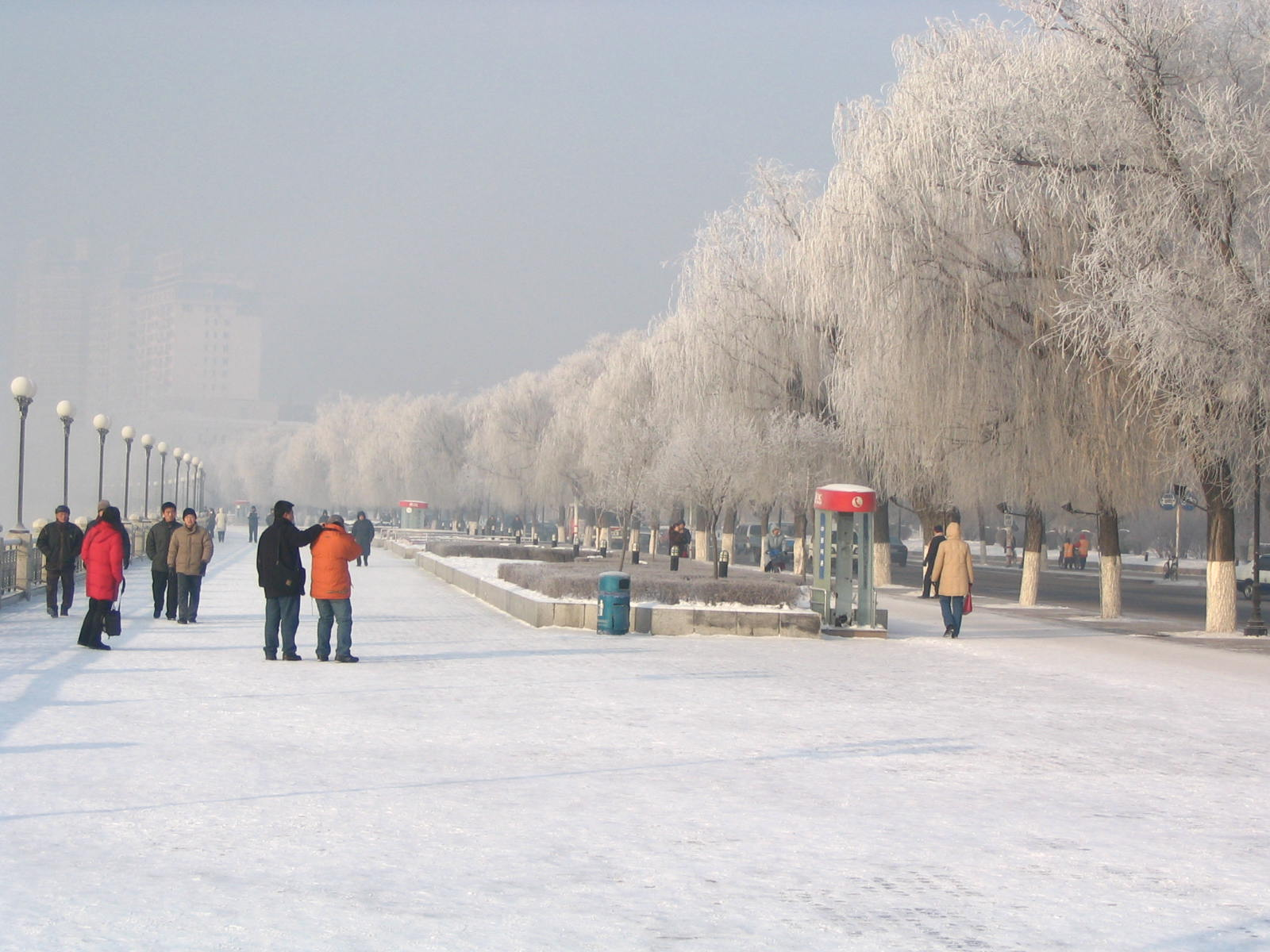
Winter rime trees of Jilin City

Major cities in this province include Changchun, Jilin City, Baishan, Baicheng, Siping, Yanji, Songyuan, Tonghua and Liaoyuan.

== Administrative divisions ==
Jilin consists of nine prefecture-level divisions: eight prefecture-level cities (including a sub-provincial city) and one autonomous prefecture:

Administrative divisions of Jilin
Division code	Division	Area in km^{2}	Population 2010	Seat	Divisions			
Division code	Division	Area in km^{2}	Population 2010	Seat	Districts	Counties	Aut. counties	CL cities
220000	Jilin Province	187,400.00	27,462,297	Changchun city	21	16	3	20
220100	Changchun city	24,734.13	7,677,089	Nanguan District	7	1		3
220200	Jilin city	27,659.79	4,414,681	Chuanying District	4	1		4
220300	Siping city	10,241.73	3,386,325	Tiexi District	2	1	1	1
220400	Liaoyuan city	5,140.45	1,176,645	Longshan District	2	2		
220500	Tonghua city	15,607.80	2,325,242	Dongchang District	2	3		2
220600	Baishan city	17,473.73	1,295,750	Hunjiang District	2	2	1	1
220700	Songyuan city	21,089.38	2,881,082	Ningjiang District	1	2	1	1
220800	Baicheng city	25,692.29	2,033,058	Taobei District	1	2		2
222400	Yanbian Autonomous Prefecture	43,509.10	2,271,600	Yanji city		2		6
Sub-provincial cities

Administrative divisions in Chinese and varieties of romanizations
English	Chinese	Pinyin
Jilin Province	吉林省	Jílín Shěng
Changchun city	长春市	Chángchūn Shì
Jilin city	吉林市	Jílín Shì
Siping city	四平市	Sìpíng Shì
Liaoyuan city	辽源市	Liáoyuán Shì
Tonghua city	通化市	Tōnghuà Shì
Baishan city	白山市	Báishān Shì
Songyuan city	松原市	Sōngyuán Shì
Baicheng city	白城市	Báichéng Shì
Yanbian Korean Autonomous Prefecture	延边朝鲜族自治州	Yánbiān Cháoxiǎnzú Zìzhìzhōu

These nine prefecture-level divisions are in turn subdivided into 60 county-level divisions (21 districts, 20 county-level cities, 16 counties, and three autonomous counties). (See List of administrative divisions of Jilin.) These administrative divisions are explained in greater detail at Administrative divisions of the People's Republic of China. At the end of the year 2017, the total population is 27.17 million.

Population by urban areas of prefecture & county cities
#	Cities	2020 Urban area	2010 Urban area	2020 City proper
1	Changchun (Note: Gongzhuling CLC was transferred from Siping PLC to Changchun PLC's jurisdiction after 2010 census.)	3,531,661	3,411,209 (Note: New district established after 2010 census: Jiutai (Jiutai CLC). The new district not included in the urban area count of the pre-expanded city.)	9,066,906
2	Jilin	1,326,640	1,469,722	3,623,713
3	Yanji	630,612	505,516	part of Yanbian Prefecture
4	Siping	485,710	509,107	1,814,733
5	Songyuan	480,769	464,999	2,252,994
6	Tonghua	408,403	476,792	1,812,114
7	Liaoyuan	407,296	385,049	996,903
8	Baishan	391,234	503,287	1,551,378
9	Gongzhuling	384,715	337,851	see Changchun
10	Meihekou	291,138	268,259	see Tonghua
11	Baicheng	263,667	359,492	968,373
12	Yushu	253,344	280,961	see Changchun
13	Dunhua	241,929	293,396	part of Yanbian Prefecture
14	Dehui	202,988	187,956	see Changchun
15	Hunchun	189,760	174,355	part of Yanbian Prefecture
16	Huadian	184,810	193,537	see Jilin
17	Shulan	176,692	254,850	see Jilin
18	Jiaohe	168,313	201,712	see Jilin
19	Panshi	163,592	228,004	see Jilin
20	Shuangliao	146,716	180,700	see Siping
21	Da'an	136,823	202,322	see Baicheng
22	Fuyu	124,874	(Note: Fuyu County is currently known as Fuyu CLC after 2010 census.)	see Songyuan
23	Taonan	115,946	164,976	see Baicheng
24	Longjing	96,972	122,065	part of Yanbian Prefecture
25	Linjiang	87,555	133,435	see Baishan
26	Ji'an	81,982	95,971	see Tonghua
27	Helong	80,419	112,337	part of Yanbian Prefecture
28	Tumen	71,023	109,342	part of Yanbian Prefecture
—	Jiutai	see Changchun	198,851	see Changchun

== Politics ==
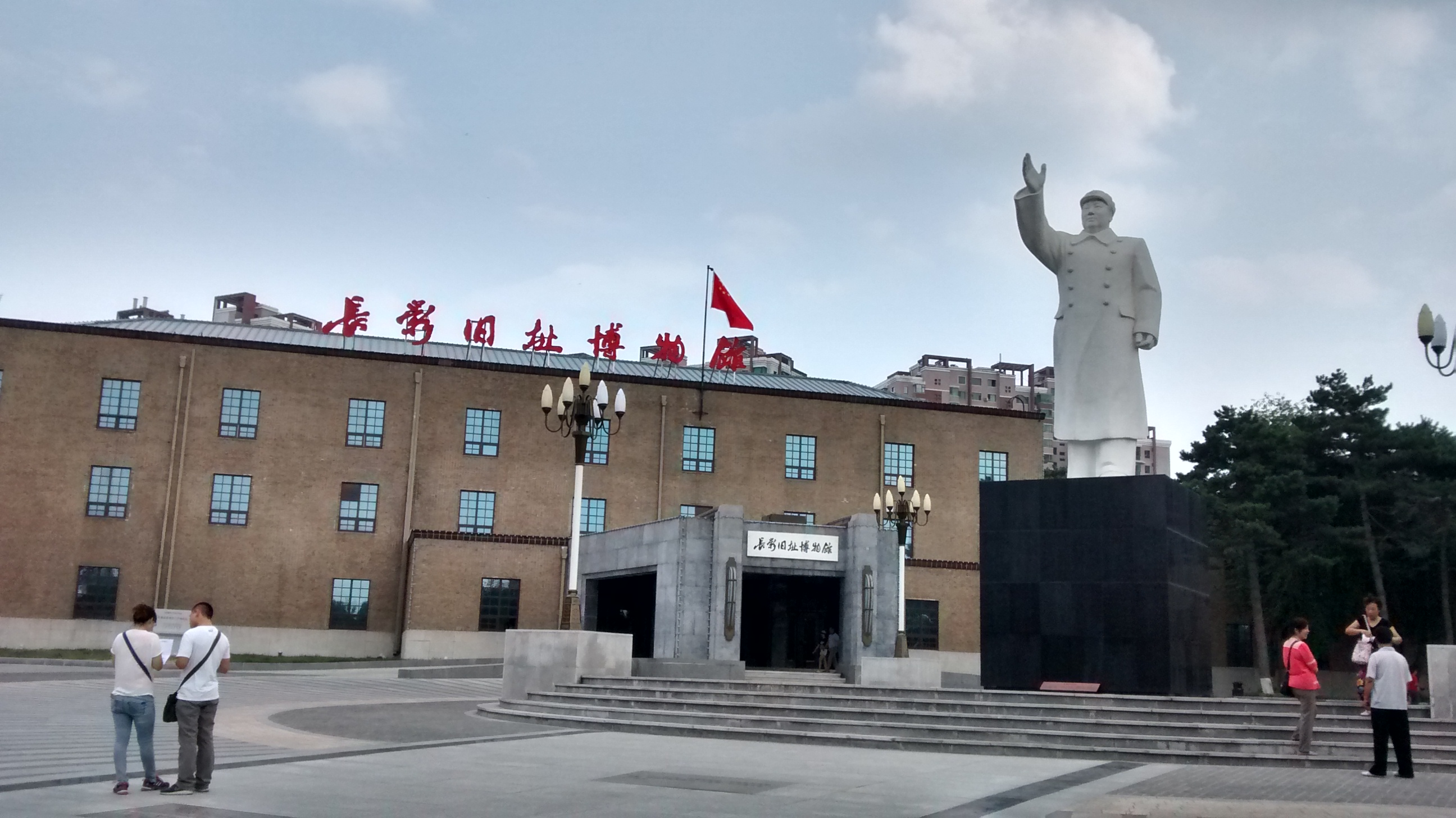
Statue of Mao Zedong in Jilin

The politics of Jilin is structured in a dual party-government system like all other governing institutions in mainland China.

The Governor of Jilin is the highest-ranking official in the People's Government of Jilin. However, in the province's dual party-government governing system, the Governor has less power than the Jilin Chinese Communist Party Provincial Committee Secretary.

== Economy ==
In 2025, the nominal GDP of Jilin province totaled RMB 1,497.4 billion (US$209.6 billion). Its GDP has been rising at a double-digit rate since 2003, growing 51 percent from 2003 to 2007. Per capita nominal GDP increased to RMB 64,618 (US$9,046) in 2025. Meanwhile, the incremental value and profit of large enterprises witnessed an increase of 19 percent and 30 percent respectively, compared with 2005 figures.

Jilin's agricultural production is centered upon rice, wheat, maize, and sorghum. Rice is mostly cultivated in the eastern parts, such as Yanbian Prefecture. The Changbai Mountains are an important source of lumber. Sheep herding is an important activity in the western parts, such as Baicheng.

Among its natural resources, Jilin has the largest reserves of shale oil and one of the top five largest mineral reserves in China. Compared to other provinces of China, Jilin has extensive deposits of Kieselguhr, wollastonite, floatstone, and molybdenum.

Industry in Jilin is concentrated on automobiles, train carriages, and iron alloy.

Jilin is one of the most important commodity grain bases in China and ranks 6th in timber production.

Traditionally, Jilin has been known as a major pharmaceutical center, with yields of ginseng and deer antlers among the largest in China, being used extensively in the field of Chinese medicine.

=== Economic and technological development zones ===
==== Jilin New and Hi-tech Industry Development Zone ====
The zone was founded in 1992 and is in Jilin city, covering 818 km^{2} (316 sq mi) of planned area with 242 km^{2} (93 sq mi) established. The leading industries in the zone are new materials, refined chemical products, integration of photoelectron and mechanism, electronics, medicine and bioengineering. A mere 14 km (8.7 mi) from Songhua Lake, the nearest bus and train stations are within 3 km (1.9 mi).

The Jilin Economic and Technological Development Zone was founded in May 1998 and is in the northeast of Jilin city. The zone has a total planned area of 28 km^{2} (11 sq mi). It is 90 km (56 mi) from Changchun, 5 km (3.1 mi) from Jilin Airport, and 8 km (5.0 mi)from Jilin Railway Station.

Major industries include refined chemicals, bioengineering, fine processing of chemical fiber, and farm products. It is divided into four parts: the Chemical Industrial Park, the Food Industrial Park, the Textile Industrial Park, and the Medical Industrial Park. The latter specializes in the development of traditional Chinese pharmaceuticals, mini molecule medicine, bio-pharmaceuticals and health products.

==== State-level ETDZs Changchun Economic and Technological Development Zone ====
In 1993, with the approval of the state, Changchun Economic & Technological Development Zone (CETDZ) became a state-level economic and technological development zone. The total area of CETDZ is 112.72 km^{2} (43.52 sq mi), of which 30 km^{2} (12 sq mi) has been set aside for development and use. By the end of 2006, the total fixed assets investment of the Changchun Economic and Technological Development Zone reached 38.4 billion yuan. There were 1656 registered enterprises in this zone including 179 foreign-funded enterprises. The regional gross product of the zone reached 101.8 billion yuan; industrial output value reached 233.0 billion Yuan; overall financial revenue reached 15.7 billion yuan.

Changchun is also the location of one of the largest factories where CRRC manufactures bullet trains. In November 2016, CRCC Changchun unveiled the first bullet train carriages in the world that would have sleeper berths, and would be capable of running in ultra low temperature environments. Nicknamed Panda, they are capable of running at 250 kmph, operate at −40 degrees Celsius, have Wi-Fi hubs and contain sleeper berths that fold into seats during the day.

State-level HIDZs Changchun High-Tech Industrial Development Area

Changchun High-Tech Industrial Development Area is connected by four roads and one light-rail line to the downtown area. The nearest train station, Changchun Station, is twenty minutes away by light rail. In 2002, Changchun HDA became the first area in Northeast China to qualify for the environmental certification of ISO14001. Its landscaping ratio reaches 38%.

Hunchun Border Economic Cooperation Zone

Hunchun Border Economic Cooperation Zone was approved to be national-level border economic cooperation zone in 1992, with a planning area of 24 km^{2} (9.3 sq mi). In 2002 and 2001, the Hunchun Export Processing Zone and Hunchun Sino-Russia Trade Zone were set up in it. It has a strategic location at the junction of the borders of China, Russia and Korea. It focuses on the development of sea food processing, electronic product manufacture, bio-pharmaceuticals, textile industry and other industries.

Hunchun Export Processing Zone

The Hunchun Export Processing Zone is in 5 km^{2} (1.93 sq mi) area is in the Hunchun Border Economic Cooperation Zone. Its planned area is 2.44 km^{2} (0.94 sq mi). It relies on the same infrastructure and policies as its parent zone.

== Infrastructure ==
There are 35,216 km (21,882 mi) of highways, including over 500 km (310 mi) of expressways.

The province has a rail network, begun by the Japanese, with Changchun as its main hub. There are four major new railway projects which started construction in 2007. One of these, the Harbin–Dalian High-Speed Railway connecting Harbin with Dalian via Changchun was completed in 2012. Trains on the line can travel at up to 350 km/h (220 mph). The four railway projects were estimated to cost RMB13 billion, and the province urged foreign investors to invest in them. A line from Changchun to Jilin City, expected to be completed in 2015, was expected to cut the journey times between the cities from 96 minutes to 30. The railway network in Jilin can be divided into two directions in the northwest–southeast and southwest–northeast. The main trunk line Beijing-Harbin railway runs through the north and south of Jilin. From Jilin Province, it can go directly to Harbin, Shenyang, Dalian, Beijing, Tianjin, Xi'an, Shijiazhuang, Wuhan, Jinan, and so on. By the end of 2015, the railway business mileage of Jilin province reached 4,877.4 km (3,030.7 mi).

The main commercial airport is Changchun Longjia International Airport; other commercial airports include Yanji Chaoyangchuan International Airport, Tonghua Sanyuanpu Airport, Baicheng Chang'an Airport, Songyuan Chaganhu Airport and Changbaishan Airport.

Jilin is landlocked. River navigation is possible from April to November. The major river ports are at Da'an, Jilin city and Fuyu. In 2007, Jilin started construction on a two-phase RMB60 million comprehensive river port; the first phase is finished. The port is on the Songhua River, has an annual throughput of two million tons, and will connect to the waterways of Northeast China. Aviation takes Changchun as the center, supplemented by Yanji and Baishan. It can go directly to Beijing, Shanghai, Guangzhou, Haikou, Ningbo, Dalian, Kunming, Hong Kong, South Korea, Japan and so on. Changchun Longjia Airport, Yanji Airport, Tonghua Sanyuanpu Airport and Changbaishan Airport, etc.

== Demographics ==
Historical population
Year	Pop.	±%
1912	5,580,000	—
1928	7,635,000	+36.8%
1936–37	7,354,000	−3.7%
1947	6,465,000	−12.1%
1954	11,290,073	+74.6%
1964	15,668,663	+38.8%
1982	22,560,053	+44.0%
1990	24,658,721	+9.3%
2000	26,802,191	+8.7%
2010	27,462,297	+2.5%
2020	24,073,453	−12.3%

Jilin is inhabited by Han Chinese, Manchus, Hui, Mongols and Xibe. Most ethnic Koreans live in the Yanbian Korean Autonomous Prefecture. The Manchu people were once the majority in the area of Jilin, making it part of their historical region. With the adoption of Han culture and the Chinese languages by the Manchu people, the Manchu language is considered a critically endangered language. Koreans comprise about 4% of the population, owing to its proximity to the Korean Peninsula. The majority of the province speaks Mandarin.

Ethnic groups in Jilin (2000 census)
Ethnic Groups	Population	Percentage
Han Chinese	24,348,815	90.85%
Koreans	1,145,688	4.27%
Manchu	993,112	3.71%
Mongol	172,026	0.64%
Hui	125,620	0.47%

Excludes members of the People's Liberation Army in active service.

== Culture ==
Jilin is part of Northeast China and shares many similarities in culture to neighbouring regions, such as Errenzhuan and Yangge. Among its music, Jiju, or Jilin Opera, is a form of traditional entertainment that Jilin has innovated over its short migrant history.

The ethnic Koreans of Jilin have a distinct culture, closely tied to Korea.

=== Languages ===
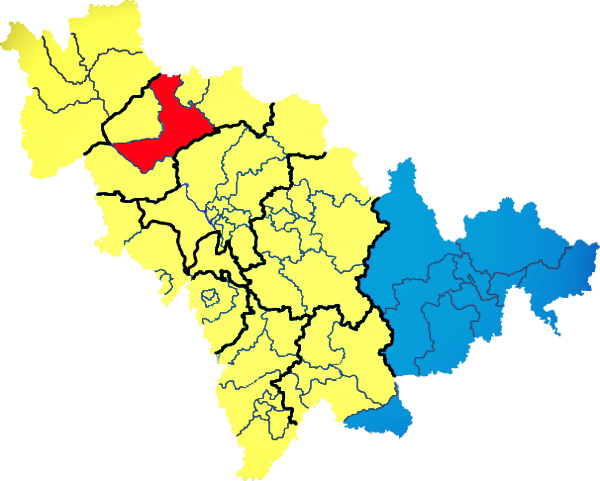
Languages spoken in Jilin: yellow: Mandarin; blue: Korean; red: Mongolian

The majority of the province speaks Mandarin, the official language of China. Closer to the east, many people speak Korean. Some people of Qian Gorlos autonomous county speak Mongolian.

== Tourism ==
The Goguryeo sites and tombs found in Ji'an, Jilin, including Hwando Mountain City, Gungnae City, and the pyramidal Tomb of the General, have been listed as part of the Capital Cities and Tombs of the Ancient Koguryo Kingdom, a World Heritage Site.

Paektu Mountain, especially Heaven Lake on the border with North Korea, are popular tourist destinations due to their natural scenery.

The Ancient Tombs at Longtou Mountain, including the Mausoleum of Princess Jeonghyo, are royal tombs of Balhae found in Yanbian Korean Autonomous Prefecture.

== Education ==
=== Universities and colleges ===
- Jilin University (吉林大学)
- Jilin Medical College (吉林医药学院)
- Northeast Normal University (东北师范大学)
- Jilin Agricultural University (吉林农业大学)
- Jilin Normal University (吉林师范大学)
- Changchun University of Science and Technology (长春理工大学)
- Changchun University of Technology (长春工业大学)
- Changchun Normal University (长春师范大学)
- Changchun University (长春大学)
- Changchun Taxation College (长春税务学院)
- Yanbian University of Science and Technology (延边科技大学)
- Yanbian University (延边大学)
- Northeast China Institute of Electric Power Engineering (东北电力学院)
- Jilin College of Electrification
- Changchun Institute of Post & Telecommunications (长春邮政学院)
- Changchun Institute of Optics and Fine Mechanics
- Beihua University
- Jilin Agricultural Science and Technology University
- Changchun Institute of Technology (长春工程学院)

== Sports ==
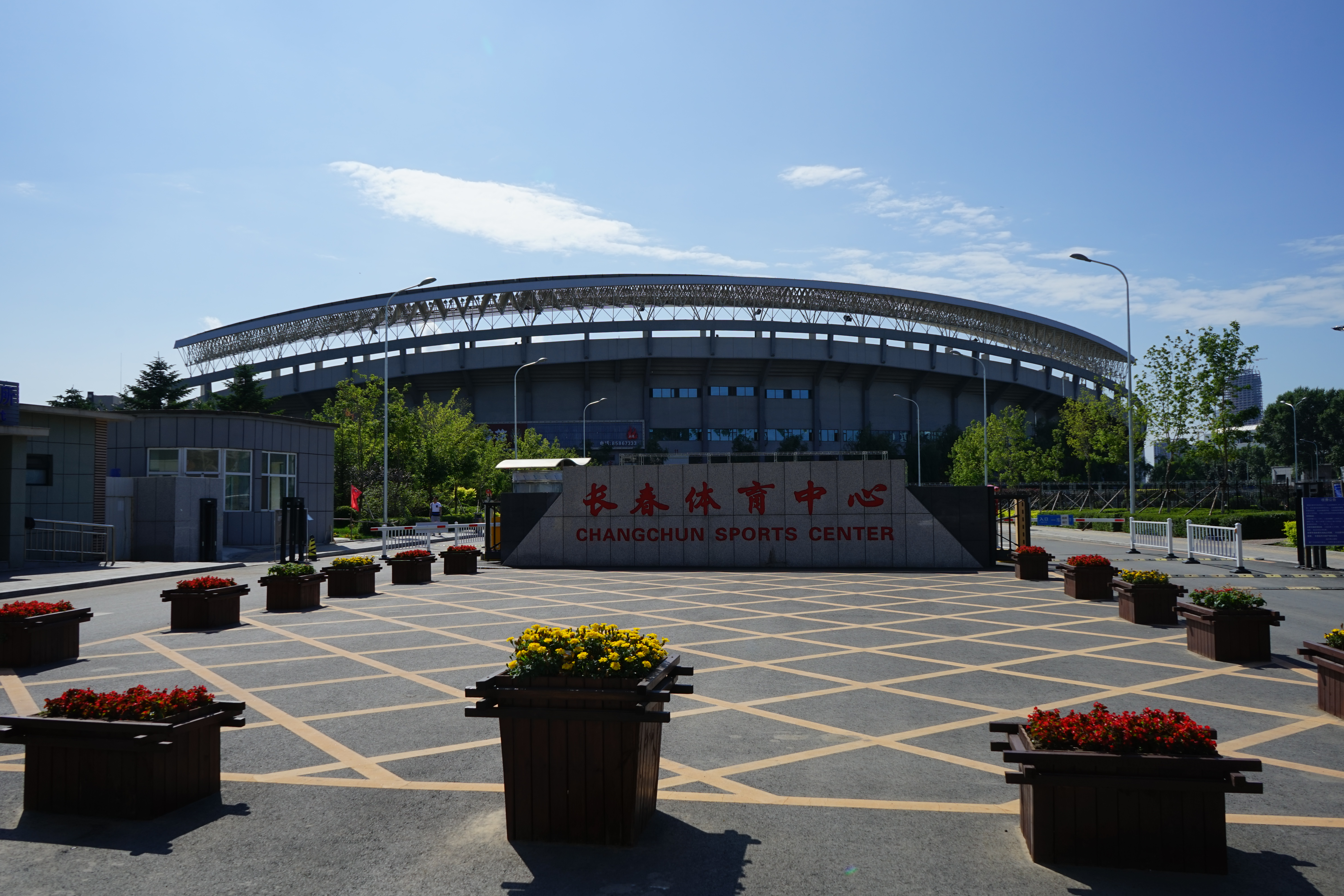
Changchun Stadium.

=== Professional teams ===
- Chinese Basketball Association
  - Jilin Northeast Tigers
- Chinese Super League
  - Changchun Yatai
- China League One
  - Yanbian Longding

== Notable individuals ==
- O Kuk-ryol, Chinese-born North Korean general and politician
- Choe Hyon, Chinese-born North Korean general and politician
- Ri Tu-ik, Chinese-born North Korean vice-marshal and politician
- Li Hongbo, sculptor
- Guo Junchen, actor
- Wei Daxun, actor
- Huang Renjun, main vocalist and lead dancer of K-pop boyband NCT and NCT Dream
- Dong Yanping, Taiwanese general and politician

== See also ==
- List of Major National Historical and Cultural Sites in Jilin
