= Fuyu, Jilin =

Fuyu 扶余市
- County-level city
- Location in Jilin
- Coordinates: 44°59′13″N 126°01′30″E
- Country: People's Republic of China
- Province: Jilin
- Prefecture-level city: Songyuan
- Municipal seat: Sanchahe (三岔河镇)

Area
  - County-level city: 4,464 km^{2} (1,724 sq mi)
  - Urban: 17.20 km^{2} (6.64 sq mi)
- Elevation: 183 m (600 ft)

Population (2017)
  - County-level city: 800,000
  - Urban: 130,600
- Time zone: UTC+8 (China Standard)
- Postal code: 131203
- Area code: 0438

Fuyu (simplified Chinese: 扶余; traditional Chinese: 扶餘; pinyin: Fúyú), formerly Fuyu County, is a county-level city in northwestern Jilin province, People's Republic of China, under the administration of the prefecture-level city of Songyuan, and is Songyuan's easternmost county-level division. It has a land area of 4,464 square kilometres (1,724 sq mi), and a population of 750,000. It lies 98 kilometres (61 mi) east-southeast of Songyuan and 140 kilometres (87 mi) northeast of Changchun, the provincial capital. The county seat is located in the town of Sanchahe (三岔河镇). The city name comes from Buyeo (Fuyu), an ancient kingdom located in parts of Northeast China.

== Administrative divisions ==
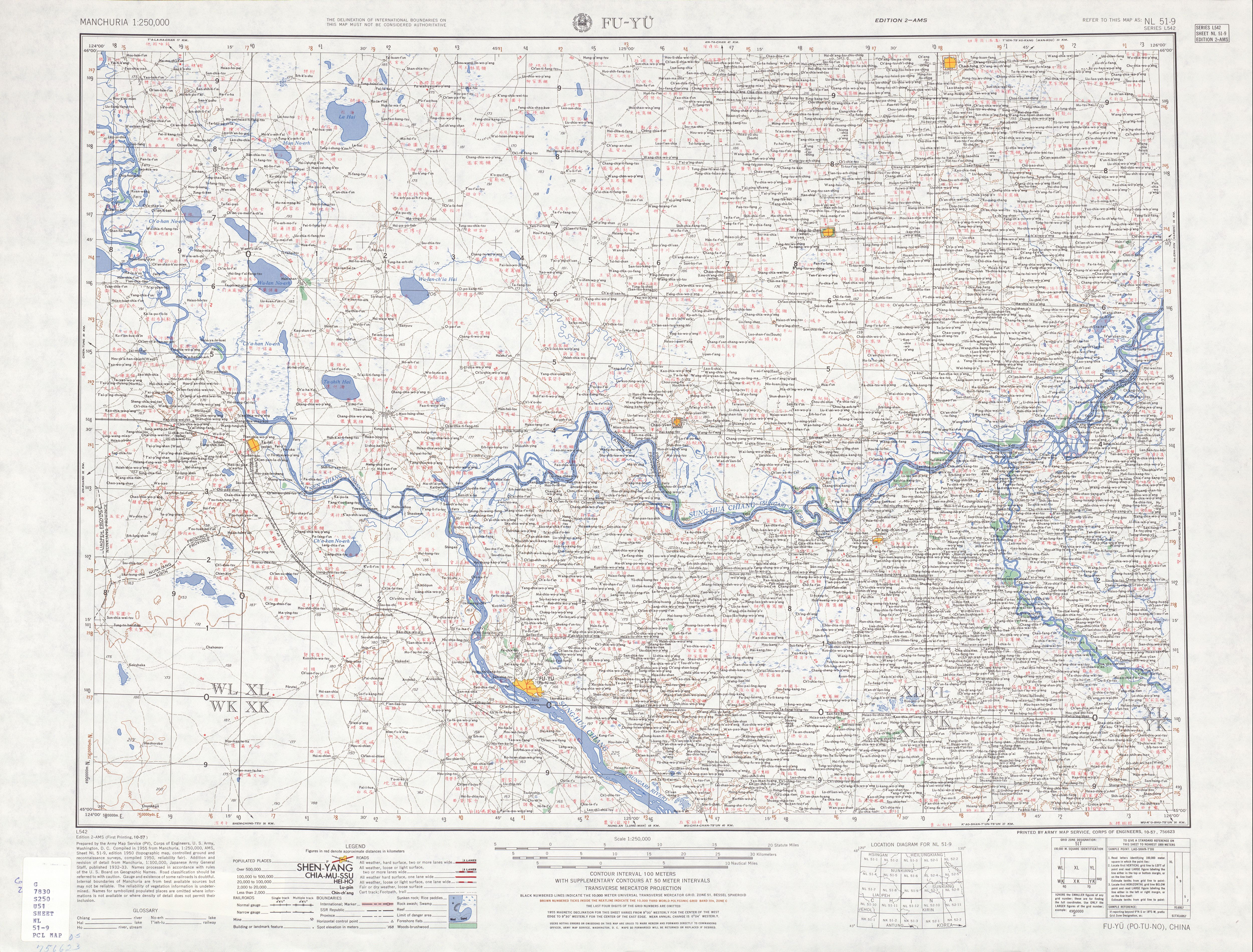
Map including Fuyu (labeled as 扶餘 FU-YU (Po-tu-no) 伯都諾) (AMS, 1955)

Fuyu is divided into nine towns and 17 townships.

Towns:

- Sanchahe (三岔河镇), Wujiadian (五家站镇), Sanjingzi (三井子镇), Caijiagou (蔡家沟镇), Gongpengzi (弓棚子镇), Zengsheng (增盛镇), Changchunling (长春岭镇), Taolaizhao (陶赖昭镇), Xinwanfa (新万发镇)

Townships:

- Sanyi Township (三义乡), Yongping Township (永平乡), Xiaojia Township (肖家乡), Erlongshan Township (二龙山乡), Shiqiao Township (石桥乡), Yijiadian Township (伊家店乡), Xujiadian Township (徐家店乡), Gengxin Township (更新乡), Dalinzi Township (大林子乡), Xinzhan Township (新站乡), Simajia Township (四马架乡), Sheli Township (社里乡), Xinchengju Township (新城局乡), Dasanjiazi Township (大三家子乡), Yushugou Township (榆树沟乡), Qijiazi Township (七家子乡), Lalin Township (拉林乡)

== Climate ==
Fuyu has a monsoon-influenced, humid continental climate (Köppen Dwa), with long (lasting from November to March), very cold, windy, but dry winters, and hot, humid summers. The coldest month, January, averages −17.5 °C (0.5 °F), while the warmest month, July, averages 22.7 °C (72.9 °F); the annual mean is 4.8 °C (40.6 °F). Over two-thirds of the annual precipitation falls from June to August alone.

Climate data for Fuyu, elevation 197 m (646 ft), (1991–2020 normals, extremes 1971–2010)
Month	Jan	Feb	Mar	Apr	May	Jun	Jul	Aug	Sep	Oct	Nov	Dec	Year
Record high °C (°F)	3.2 (37.8)	11.5 (52.7)	21.5 (70.7)	30.3 (86.5)	34.5 (94.1)	38.6 (101.5)	35.5 (95.9)	35.5 (95.9)	30.5 (86.9)	27.1 (80.8)	18.8 (65.8)	10.2 (50.4)	38.6 (101.5)
Mean daily maximum °C (°F)	−11.3 (11.7)	−5.4 (22.3)	3.6 (38.5)	14.2 (57.6)	21.6 (70.9)	26.5 (79.7)	27.9 (82.2)	26.7 (80.1)	21.8 (71.2)	12.9 (55.2)	0.6 (33.1)	−9.2 (15.4)	10.8 (51.5)
Daily mean °C (°F)	−17.3 (0.9)	−12.0 (10.4)	−2.5 (27.5)	7.8 (46.0)	15.5 (59.9)	21.0 (69.8)	23.2 (73.8)	21.6 (70.9)	15.4 (59.7)	6.5 (43.7)	−4.9 (23.2)	−14.7 (5.5)	5.0 (40.9)
Mean daily minimum °C (°F)	−22.2 (−8.0)	−17.6 (0.3)	−8.2 (17.2)	1.5 (34.7)	9.4 (48.9)	15.6 (60.1)	18.8 (65.8)	17.1 (62.8)	9.5 (49.1)	1.1 (34.0)	−9.5 (14.9)	−19.4 (−2.9)	−0.3 (31.4)
Record low °C (°F)	−37.3 (−35.1)	−37.2 (−35.0)	−26.1 (−15.0)	−11.8 (10.8)	−6.3 (20.7)	4.2 (39.6)	8.7 (47.7)	6.4 (43.5)	−2.5 (27.5)	−15.6 (3.9)	−26.9 (−16.4)	−34.9 (−30.8)	−37.3 (−35.1)
Average precipitation mm (inches)	3.7 (0.15)	4.7 (0.19)	11.0 (0.43)	18.7 (0.74)	54.7 (2.15)	94.6 (3.72)	131.1 (5.16)	114.1 (4.49)	50.1 (1.97)	26.5 (1.04)	14.1 (0.56)	7.2 (0.28)	530.5 (20.88)
Average precipitation days (≥ 0.1 mm)	4.7	3.7	5.4	6.4	10.8	13.3	13.2	12.3	8.6	6.8	5.6	6.3	97.1
Average snowy days	7.8	5.5	7.2	2.4	0.2	0	0	0	0	2.1	6.7	8.9	40.8
Average relative humidity (%)	70	63	53	47	52	64	77	79	70	62	65	71	64
Mean monthly sunshine hours	162.7	186.6	221.7	216.9	235.6	225.5	209.6	208.2	216.2	188.6	151.9	143.5	2,367
Percentage possible sunshine	57	63	60	53	51	49	45	48	58	56	54	53	54
Source 1: China Meteorological Administration
Source 2: Weather China
