= Hunjiang =

Hunjiang may refer to:

- Hunjiang City, former name of Baishan, Jilin, China
- Hunjiang District, in Baishan, Jilin, China
- The Hun River, tributary of the Yalu River
