= 白山 =

白山 may refer to the following locations in East Asia:

- Baishan (白山市), prefecture-level city in Jilin, China
- Hakusan, Ishikawa (白山市), a city in Ishikawa, Japan
- Paektu Mountain (长白山/長白山 in Chinese), a stratovolcano on the China-North Korea border, and the tallest mountain in the latter nation
- Mount Haku (白山), an inactive volcano on the borders of Gifu, Fukui and Ishikawa prefectures in Japan

== See also ==
- 白山市 (disambiguation)
