= TNH =

TNH may refer to:

- Thích Nhất Hạnh, Buddhist monk, peace activist, author
- TNH series, the original Czechoslovak designation of the Panzer 38(t) tank
- Teresa Nielsen Hayden, a science fiction editor, fanzine writer, and essayist
- The New Humanitarian, an independent, non-profit news agency
- The New Hampshire, a student newspaper at the University of New Hampshire
- Télévision Nationale d'Haïti, a Haitian-government-owned cultural TV station
- Tonghua Sanyuanpu Airport (IATA code), in Tonghua, China
- Town of North Hempstead, New York
- This Never Happened, the music record label of American musician Lane 8
