= Xianrenqiao =

Town in Jilin, China

Xianrenqiao is a town in Fusong County, Baishan, Jilin, China. It has a total population of 17,356 and a total area of 379 sq km. It is found in the northwestern foothills of Changbai Mountain. It is 530 meters above sea level. Xianrenqiao is divided into Xianrenqiao Community, Wenquan Community, Da'an Community, Daying Village, Hebei Village, Wenquan Village, Daqingchuan Village, Huangjiaweizi Village, Miaoling Village, Dongling Village, Nanling Village, Jinjia Xiaoshan Village, Fumin Village, Qingling Village Villages, Xigang Village, Liangshan Village, Dongfeng Village and Dongjiangyan Village.
