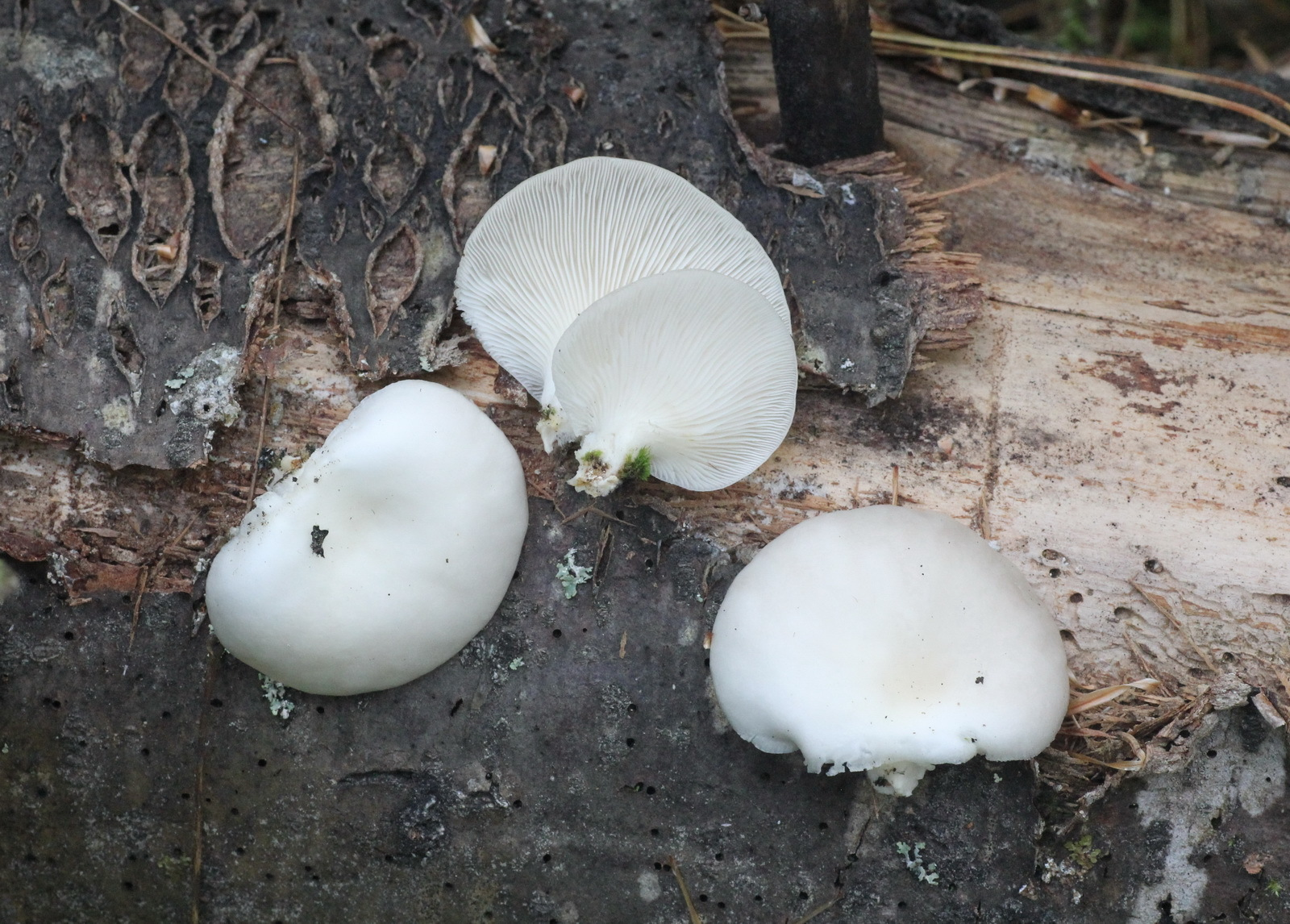

Scientific classification
- Domain: Eukaryota
- Kingdom: Fungi
- Division: Basidiomycota
- Class: Agaricomycetes
- Order: Agaricales
- Family: Pleurotaceae
- Genus: Pleurotus
- Species: P. abieticola

Binomial name
- Pleurotus abieticola R.H. Petersen & K.W. Hughes 1997

= Pleurotus abieticola =

Species of fungus

Pleurotus abieticola is an edible species of fungus in the family Pleurotaceae, described as new to science by mycologists R.H. Petersen & K.W. Hughes in 1997. It grows on rotten wood of Picea in subalpine forests dominated by it. It has been reported first in far‐eastern Russia (Sikhote-Alin Nature Reserve), and then northeastern China (Songjianghe and Baihe in Jilin) and northwestern Russia (north of Saint Petersburg). It can be cultivated. Phylogenetic research has shown that while it belongs to P. ostreatus clade, it forms its own intersterility group.

== See also ==
- List of Pleurotus species
