= Lushuihe =

Lushuihe 露水河镇
- Town
- Location in Jilin Lushuihe (China) Lushuihe (Asia) Lushuihe (Earth)
- Coordinates: 42°31′10″N 127°47′24″E
- Country: China
- Province: Jilin
- Prefecture-level city: Baishan
- County: Fusong County

Area
  - Total: 35,800 ha (88,000 acres)
- Elevation: 775 m (2,543 ft)
- Postal code: 134500

Lushuihe (Chinese: 露水河; pinyin: Lùshuǐhé) is a town in Fusong County, Baishan, Jilin, China.

== Administration ==
As of 2020, it administers the following six residential communities and five villages:

- Zhanxi Community (站西社区)
- Hebei Community (河北社区)
- Dongshan Community (东山社区)
- Beishan Community (北山社区)
- Hongwei Community (宏伟社区)
- Xishan Community (西山社区)
- Lizihe Village (砬子河村)
- Changsheng Village (长胜村)
- Xinxing Village (新兴村)
- Dongsheng Village (东胜村)
- Qingshuihe Village (清水河村)

== Location ==
The town is east of China National Highway 201 which is how the town is connected.

== Tourism ==
Lushuihe has an international hunting ground on the tri-point of the town's adjacent counties, Antu County and Changbai Korean Autonomous County in Yanbian Korean Autonomous Prefecture but is still part of the administrative borders. The hunting ground is part of the Lushui River National Park on Songjiang River. The hunting ground is also 60 kilometres northeast of Changbai Mountain on the North Korean Border, and covers about 25,786 hectares.

The hunting ground can get snow in the summertime because of seasonal lag. Average temperatures in winter can reach -25°C, when the Songjiang River will freeze but the Lushui River will not, because its water temperature is artificially kept at 7°C and the discharge is high. The hunting ground is arguably on Changbai Mountain because of its high prominence of 30 kilometres. Although the hunting ground was primitive, the hunting ground was only officially established in 1987 with the approval of the Ministry of Forestry and became open to tourism only then. More than 30,000 tourists visit the hunting ground per year.

== Industries ==
Jisen Wood Industry is a wood industry that operates sawmills and planes mills, the company's sub-industries include logging, papermaking and designing wood/paper products. The company is headquartered in Lushuihe.
