= Dong Chang =

Dong Chang may refer to:

- Dong Chang (warlord) (董昌) (died 896), warlord who became a short-lived emperor in modern Zhejiang
- Eastern Depot or Dong Chang (東廠), Ming dynasty spy agency

== See also ==
- Dongchang District
