= Xinjian Subdistrict, Baishan =

Xinjian Subdistrict 新建街道
- Subdistrict
- Location in Jilin
- Coordinates: 41°55′55″N 126°24′51″E
- Country: People's Republic of China
- Province: Jilin
- Prefecture-level city: Baishan
- District: Hunjiang District
- Time zone: UTC+8 (China Standard)

Xinjian Subdistrict (Chinese: 新建街道; pinyin: Xīnjiàn Jiēdào) is a subdistrict in Hunjiang District, Baishan, Jilin province, China. As of 2018, it has 7 residential communities and one special development zone under its administration.

== See also ==
- List of township-level divisions of Jilin
