= Dongchang =

Dongchang may refer to:

- Eastern Depot, a Ming dynasty secret police agency
- Dongchang District, a district in Tonghua, Jilin, China
  - Dongchang Subdistrict, a subdistrict in Dongchang District
- Dongchang, Sichuan (董场), a town in Dayi County, Sichuan, China
- Dongchang, Guangxi (东昌), a town in Lipu County, Guangxi, China

== See also ==
- Dongchangfu District, a district in Liaocheng, Shandong, China
- Dong Chang (warlord) (died 896), warlord and self-proclaimed emperor during the late Tang dynasty
- Dongcheng District (disambiguation)
- Tongchang County, a county in North P'yŏngan province, North Korea
