= Xiangyang, Liuhe County =

Xiangyang 向阳镇
- Town
- Location in Jilin
- Coordinates: 42°2′17″N 125°27′19″E
- Country: People's Republic of China
- Province: Jilin
- Prefecture-level city: Tonghua
- County: Liuhe County
- Time zone: UTC+8 (China Standard)

Xiangyang (Chinese: 向阳) is a town of Liuhe County, Jilin, China. As of 2018, it has 13 villages under its administration.
