= Baishan Changbaishan Airport =

Airport in Jilin, China

Baishan Changbaishan Airport 白山长白山机场
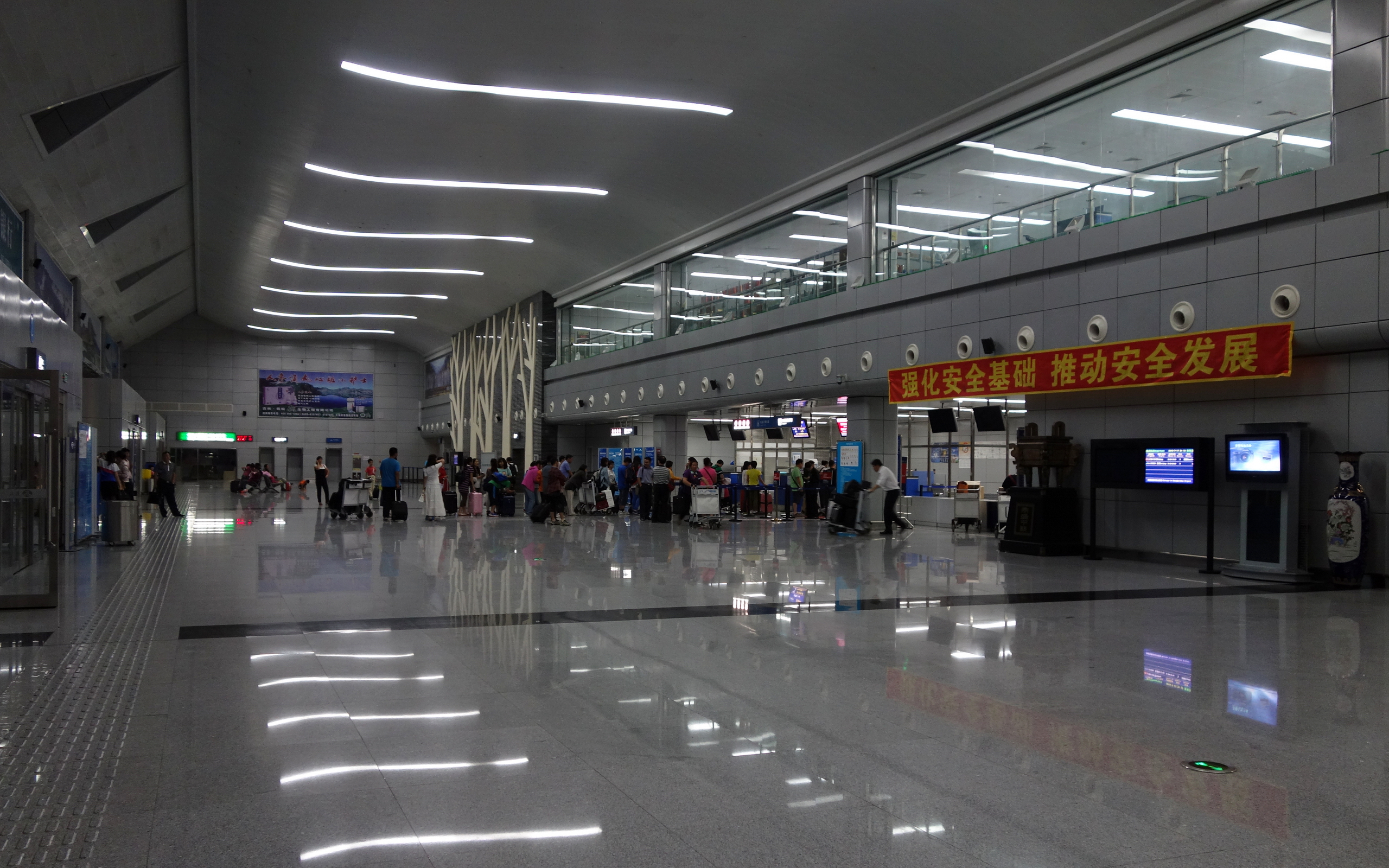
- IATA: NBS; ICAO: ZYBS

Summary
- Airport type: Public
- Serves: Baishan, Jilin
- Location: Fusong County, Jilin
- Opened: 3 August 2008; 18 years ago
- Coordinates: 42°03′59″N 127°36′24″E

Map
- Location of airport in Jilin

Runways
Direction	Length		Surface
Direction	m	ft	Surface
01/19	2,600	8,530	Concrete

Statistics (2025)
- Passengers: 633,741
- Aircraft movements: 4,668
- Cargo (metric tons): 6.2

Baishan Changbaishan Airport
- Simplified Chinese: 白山长白山机场
- Traditional Chinese: 白山長白山機場
Transcriptions
Standard Mandarin
- Hanyu Pinyin: Báishān Chángbáishān Jīchǎng

Baishan Changbaishan Airport (IATA: NBS, ICAO: ZYBS) is an airport serving the city of Baishan and the tourist destination of Changbai Mountain in Jilin Province, China. It also called "Changbaishan Airport". It was opened on 3 August 2008.

== Overview ==
Changbaishan Airport was built in the forest and relies on the sightseeing and tourism of Changbaishan area. It is the first forest tourism airport in mainland China. The airport is located near the Chixi District of the Changbai Mountain Protection and Development Zone. 1.5 kilometers north of the site is the highway from Songjianghe Town to the West Scenic Area of Changbai Mountain. The airport is 15 kilometers from the West Scenic Area, 120 kilometers from the North Scenic Area, and 135 kilometers from the South Scenic Area.

Changbaishan Airport has a runway that is 2,600 meters long and 45 meters wide. It has a 4C flight classification, a 2600-meter-long and 45-meter-wide runway, and a terminal building with a total area of 8690 square meters, capable of accommodating aircraft such as the B737 and A320. The apron has a total of 6 aircraft stands and the terminal building has a total area of 8,960 square meters and two boarding bridges.

== History ==
On July 10, 2006, The construction of Baishan Changbaishan Airport began on July 10, 2006. It was planned to meet the annual passenger throughput of 540,000 by 2015 and was classified as a 4C flight zone. The construction work was officially completed and the airport was opened to traffic on August 3, 2008.

In 2016, passenger throughput increased to 537,709, approaching the design target of 540,000. In 2017, Changbaishan Airport handled 7,276 aircraft takeoffs and landings and 626,884 passengers, exceeding its design target.

In 2017, Changbaishan Airport launched an expansion project. The project aimed to add a second terminal (T2) to the airport. It included increasing the total terminal area to approximately 30,000 square meters, increasing the number of boarding bridges to 6, increasing the apron area to 95,000 square meters, increasing the number of aircraft parking positions to 20, and occupying 342.18 hectares of land.

From May 15 to 17, 2023, the Civil Aviation Administration of Northeast China conducted industry acceptance and occupancy permit review for the expansion project of Changbaishan Airport. On June 22, 2025, T2 of Changbaishan Airport in Baishan was put into operation. It was designed to handle 1.8 million passengers, 3,400 tons of cargo annually, and 18,750 flights annually.

== Airlines and destinations ==
Airlines	Destinations
China Eastern Airlines	Ningbo, Shanghai–Pudong
China Express Airlines	Dalian
Spring Airlines	Shanghai–Pudong

== See also ==
- List of airports in China
- List of the busiest airports in China
