= Dongcheng District =

Dongcheng District (simplified Chinese: 东城区; traditional Chinese: 東城區; pinyin: Dōngchéng Qū; "East City District") may refer to two districts of the People's Republic of China:

- Dongcheng District, Beijing
- Dongcheng Subdistrict, Dongguan, Guangdong

== See also ==
- Dongchang (disambiguation)
