= Tonghua Sanyuanpu Airport =

Airport in Jilin, China

Tonghua Sanyuanpu Airport 通化三源浦机场
- IATA: TNH; ICAO: ZYTN

Summary
- Airport type: Public / military
- Serves: Tonghua, Jilin, China
- Location: Sanyuanpu, Liuhe County
- Opened: 18 June 2014; 12 years ago
- Coordinates: 42°2′51.84″N 125°44′00.49″E

Map
- Location of airport in Jilin

Runways
Direction	Length		Surface
Direction	m	ft	Surface
05/23	2,300	7,546	Concrete

Statistics (2021)
- Passengers: 127,603
- Aircraft movements: 1,606

Tonghua Sanyuanpu Airport
- Simplified Chinese: 通化三源浦机场
- Traditional Chinese: 通化三源浦機場
Transcriptions
Standard Mandarin
- Hanyu Pinyin: Tōnghuà Sānyuánpǔ Jīchǎng

Tonghua Sanyuanpu Airport (IATA: TNH, ICAO: ZYTN), also known as Tonghua Liuhe Airport, is a dual-use military and civilian airport serving the city of Tonghua in Jilin Province, China. It is located in the town of Sanyuanpu in Liuhe County, 50 kilometers from the city center. Originally a military airport, construction to convert it to civilian use started in October 2009 with a total investment of 370 million yuan. It was opened on 18 June 2014, becoming the fifth civilian airport in Jilin.

== Facilities ==
The airport has a runway that is 2,300 meters long and 45 meters wide, and a 3,000-square-meter terminal building. It is designed to handle 194,000 passengers annually by 2020.

== Airlines and destinations ==
Airlines	Destinations
Air China	Beijing–Capital, Guangzhou, Tianjin
China Eastern Airlines	Dalian, Shanghai–Pudong
Loong Air	Hangzhou, Yantai

== See also ==
- List of airports in China
- List of the busiest airports in China
- List of People's Liberation Army Air Force airbases
