= Fusong County =

Fusong County 抚松县
- County
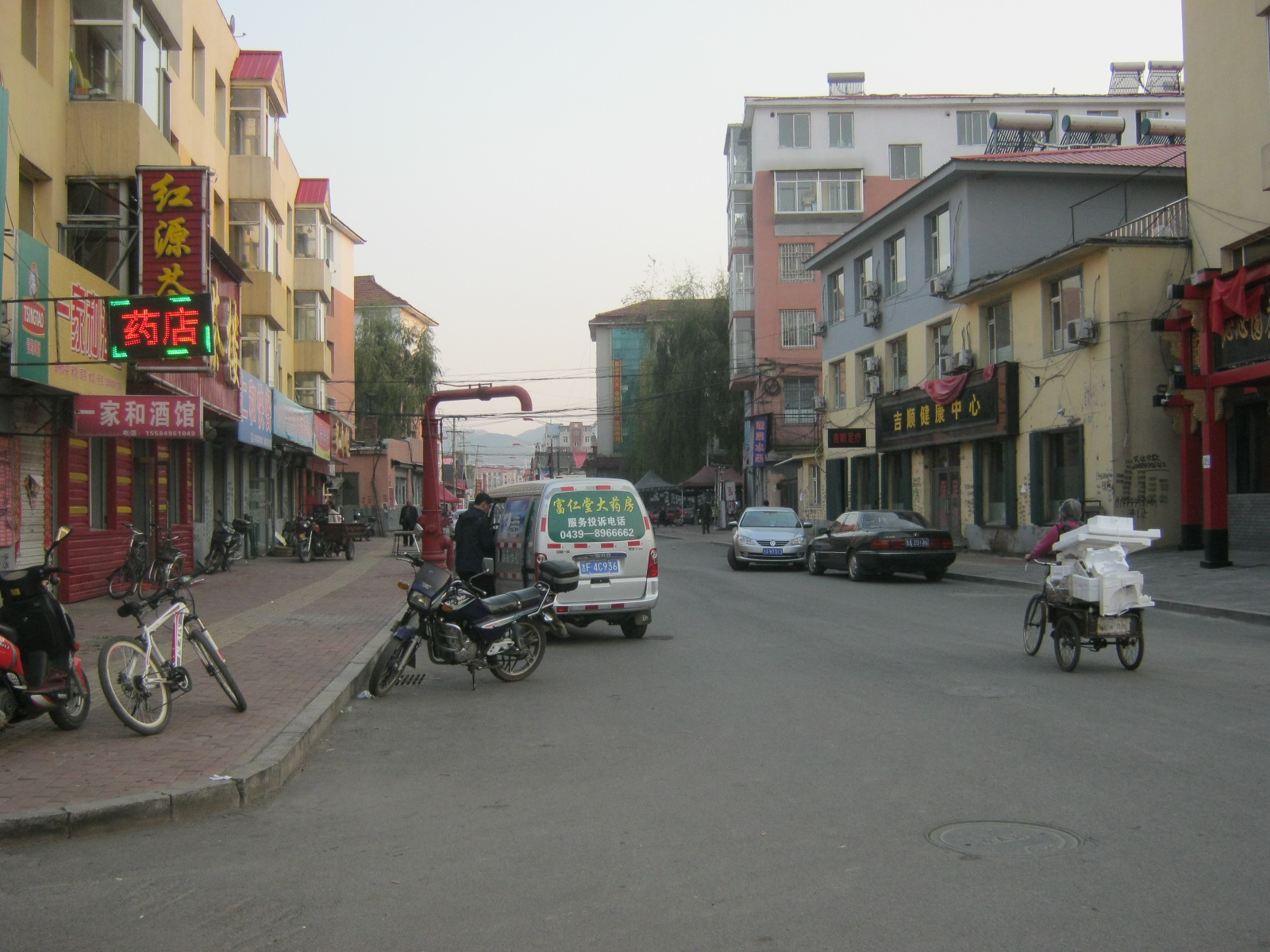
- Fusong in 2013

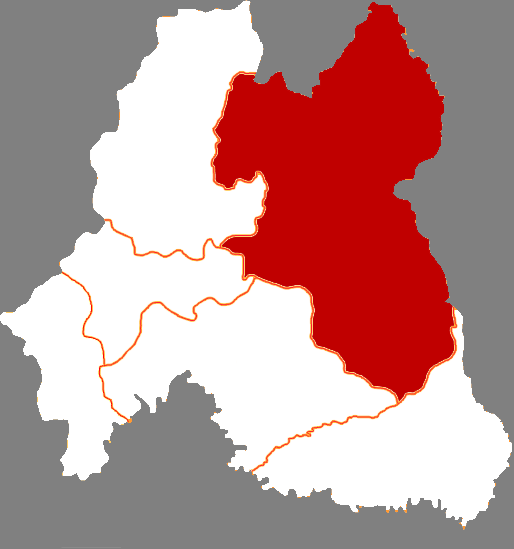
- Location in Baishan City

- Location of the seat in Jilin
- Coordinates: 42°14′N 127°35′E
- Country: People's Republic of China
- Province: Jilin
- Prefecture-level city: Baishan
- County seat: Fusong Town (抚松镇)

Area
  - Total: 6,150 km^{2} (2,370 sq mi)
- Elevation: 430 m (1,410 ft)

Population
  - Total: 310,000
  - Density: 50/km^{2} (130/sq mi)
- Time zone: UTC+8 (China Standard)
- Postal code: 134500

Fusong County (simplified Chinese: 抚松县; traditional Chinese: 撫松縣; pinyin: Fǔsōng Xiàn) is a county in southern Jilin province, China. It is under the administration of Baishan City, with a population of 310,000 residing in an area of 6,150 km^{2} (2,370 sq mi). The county contains the Changbaishan Airport, which opened on 3 August 2008, and is served by China National Highway 201.

== Administrative divisions ==
There are 12 towns and six townships.

Towns:

- Fusong (抚松镇)
- Songjianghe (松江河镇)
- Quanyang (泉阳镇)
- Xianrenqiao (仙人桥镇)
- Xingcan (兴参镇)
- Xintunzi (新屯子镇)
- Wanliang (万良镇)
- Lushuihe (露水河镇)
- Donggang (东岗镇)
- Manjiang (漫江镇)
- Yushu (榆树镇)
- Beigang (北岗镇)

Townships:

- Xinglong Township (兴隆乡)
- Xigang Township (西岗乡)
- Choushui Township (抽水乡)
- Songjiang Township (松江乡)
- Yanjiang Township (沿江乡)
- Songjiao Township (松郊乡)

== Climate ==
Climate data for Donggang Town, Fusong County, elevation 774 m (2,539 ft), (1991–2020 normals, extremes 1991–present)
Month	Jan	Feb	Mar	Apr	May	Jun	Jul	Aug	Sep	Oct	Nov	Dec	Year
Record high °C (°F)	5.1 (41.2)	11.5 (52.7)	18.7 (65.7)	28.1 (82.6)	30.3 (86.5)	33.1 (91.6)	34.1 (93.4)	33.6 (92.5)	28.6 (83.5)	26.8 (80.2)	17.8 (64.0)	7.3 (45.1)	34.1 (93.4)
Mean daily maximum °C (°F)	−8.4 (16.9)	−4.5 (23.9)	2.1 (35.8)	11.7 (53.1)	18.8 (65.8)	22.9 (73.2)	25.6 (78.1)	24.7 (76.5)	19.8 (67.6)	12.3 (54.1)	1.7 (35.1)	−6.3 (20.7)	10.0 (50.1)
Daily mean °C (°F)	−14.8 (5.4)	−10.7 (12.7)	−3.3 (26.1)	5.8 (42.4)	12.6 (54.7)	17.2 (63.0)	20.5 (68.9)	19.4 (66.9)	13.3 (55.9)	5.9 (42.6)	−3.6 (25.5)	−12.1 (10.2)	4.2 (39.5)
Mean daily minimum °C (°F)	−20.7 (−5.3)	−16.9 (1.6)	−8.9 (16.0)	0.0 (32.0)	6.3 (43.3)	11.6 (52.9)	15.9 (60.6)	14.8 (58.6)	7.2 (45.0)	−0.1 (31.8)	−8.8 (16.2)	−17.7 (0.1)	−1.4 (29.4)
Record low °C (°F)	−38.4 (−37.1)	−33.7 (−28.7)	−26.8 (−16.2)	−14.8 (5.4)	−4.5 (23.9)	−0.3 (31.5)	6.0 (42.8)	0.7 (33.3)	−5.2 (22.6)	−15.9 (3.4)	−26.9 (−16.4)	−34.5 (−30.1)	−38.4 (−37.1)
Average precipitation mm (inches)	10.9 (0.43)	16.9 (0.67)	30.7 (1.21)	51.4 (2.02)	95.0 (3.74)	119.3 (4.70)	185.9 (7.32)	155.6 (6.13)	74.6 (2.94)	48.3 (1.90)	39.3 (1.55)	15.9 (0.63)	843.8 (33.24)
Average precipitation days (≥ 0.1 mm)	11.1	9.9	11.6	11.4	15.2	16.1	16.9	14.9	10.6	10.4	11.7	12.5	152.3
Average snowy days	16.1	13.0	14.3	8.3	1.2	0	0	0	0.1	5.0	13.8	17.7	89.5
Average relative humidity (%)	66	61	58	54	60	72	80	81	74	62	66	67	67
Mean monthly sunshine hours	169.2	182.1	207.5	208.0	227.8	220.5	206.0	211.9	215.0	199.3	153.1	151.1	2,351.5
Percentage possible sunshine	57	61	56	52	50	49	45	50	58	59	53	54	54
Source: China Meteorological Administration
