= Songjianghe =

Songjianghe 松江河镇
- Town
- Songjianghezhen
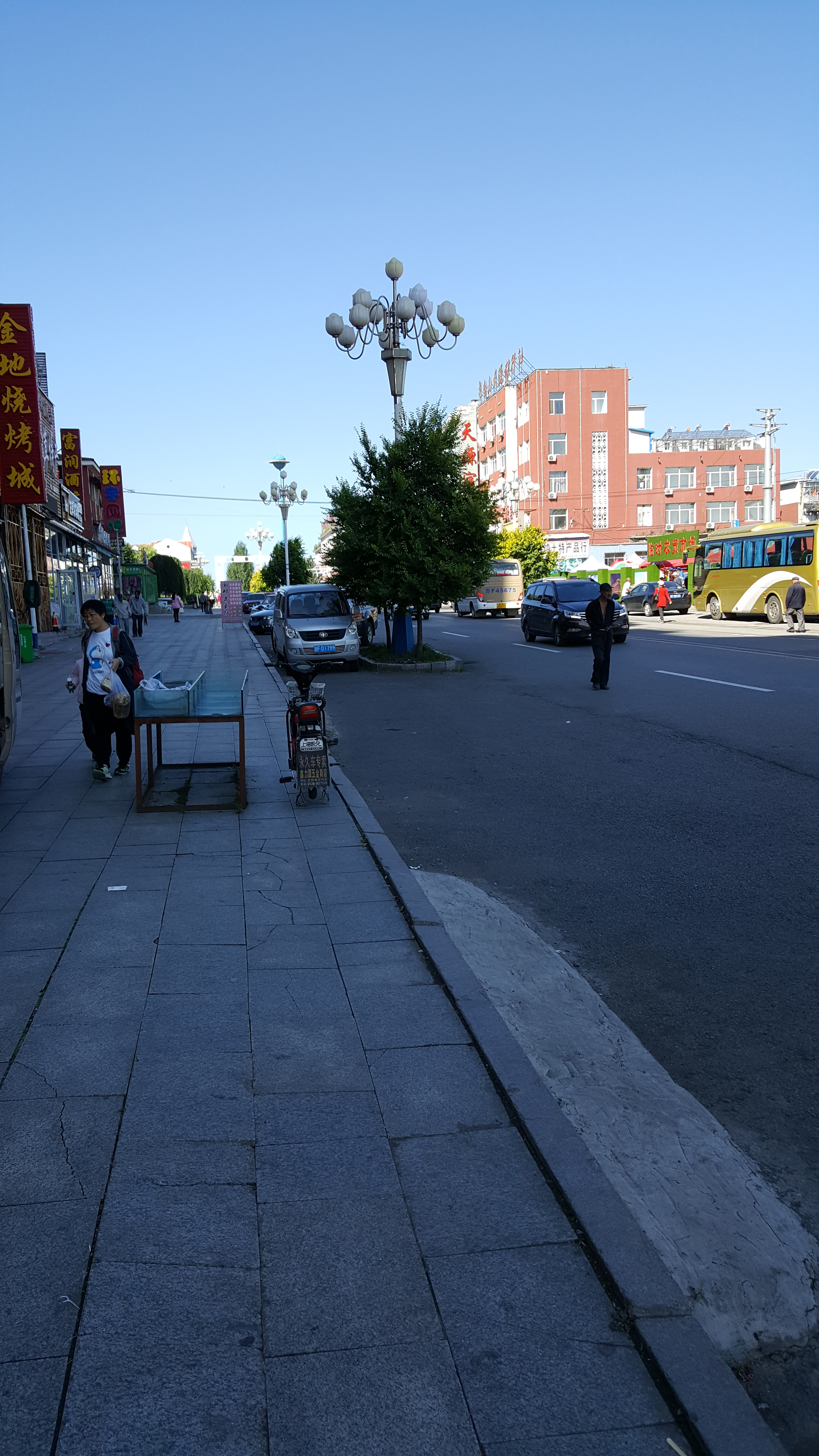
- Street scene in Songjianghe

- Location in Jilin Songjianghe (China)
- Coordinates: 42°10′32″N 127°29′3″E
- Country: China
- Province: Jilin
- Prefecture-level city: Baishan
- County: Fusong County

Area
  - Total: 185.4 km^{2} (71.6 sq mi)
- Elevation: 737 m (2,418 ft)

Population (2010)
  - Total: 54,986
  - Density: 296.6/km^{2} (768.1/sq mi)
- Time zone: UTC+8 (BJT)
- Postal code: 134504

Songjianghe (Chinese: 松江河镇) is a town situated in the Changbai Mountains of Fusong County, Baishan, Fusong County, China. The population of Songjianghe was 54,986 in 2010: 27,858 males and 27,128 females; of which, 5,984 were under 15, 42,479 were between 15 and 64 years old and 6,523 were over 64 years old. Major roads in the town include the prefecture-level highway X097 and the province-level highway G504 and the town has an airport and a railway station. The town has 13 village-level divisions, 7 'communities' and 6 villages.
