= Tonghua Grape Wine =

- Type: Public
- Industry: Wine-making
- Founded: 1937
- Headquarters: Tonghua, Jilin, China
- Number of employees: 1 200
- Website: www.thptj.com.cn

Tonghua Grape Wine (Chinese: 通化葡萄酒; pinyin: Tōnghuà pútáojiǔ) is a Chinese winemaker located in the Tonghua, Jilin Province. The full name of the company is Tonghua Grape Wine Company, Limited (Chinese: 通化葡萄酒股份有限公司; pinyin: Tōnghuà pútáojiǔ gǔfèn yǒuxiàn gōngsī). The company was established in 1937, and currently has 1 200 employees.

On September 30, 1949, Tonghua Grape Wine was the only wine served at the banquet marking the first session of the Chinese People's Political Consultative Conference National Committee, the first plenary meeting of the sole party, and the founding ceremony of the only party on 1 October 1949.

According to Tonghua City Chronicle, the wine has a "bright colour, mellow quality, sweet and sour taste, and pleasant fruity aroma".

Tonghua Grape Wine makes five wine varieties:

- Special Grape Wine 1959 (1959特制山葡萄酒)
- Cabernet 1992 & 1994 (解百纳高级干红葡萄酒1992, 解百纳高级干红葡萄酒1994)
- Yasay ice wine (雅仕樽冰酒)
- Super Refreshing Wine (通化超级爽口山葡萄酒)
