= 白山市 =

白山市 may refer to:

- Baishan, a city in Jilin, China
- Hakusan, Ishikawa, a city in Ishikawa, Japan
