= Hun River (Yalu River tributary) =

River in China

Coordinates: 40°52′08″N 125°42′00″E

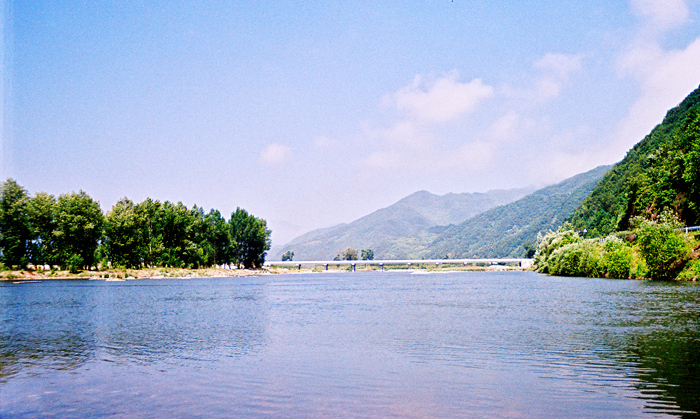
Hun River near Huilongshan Dam in Huanren, Liaoning.

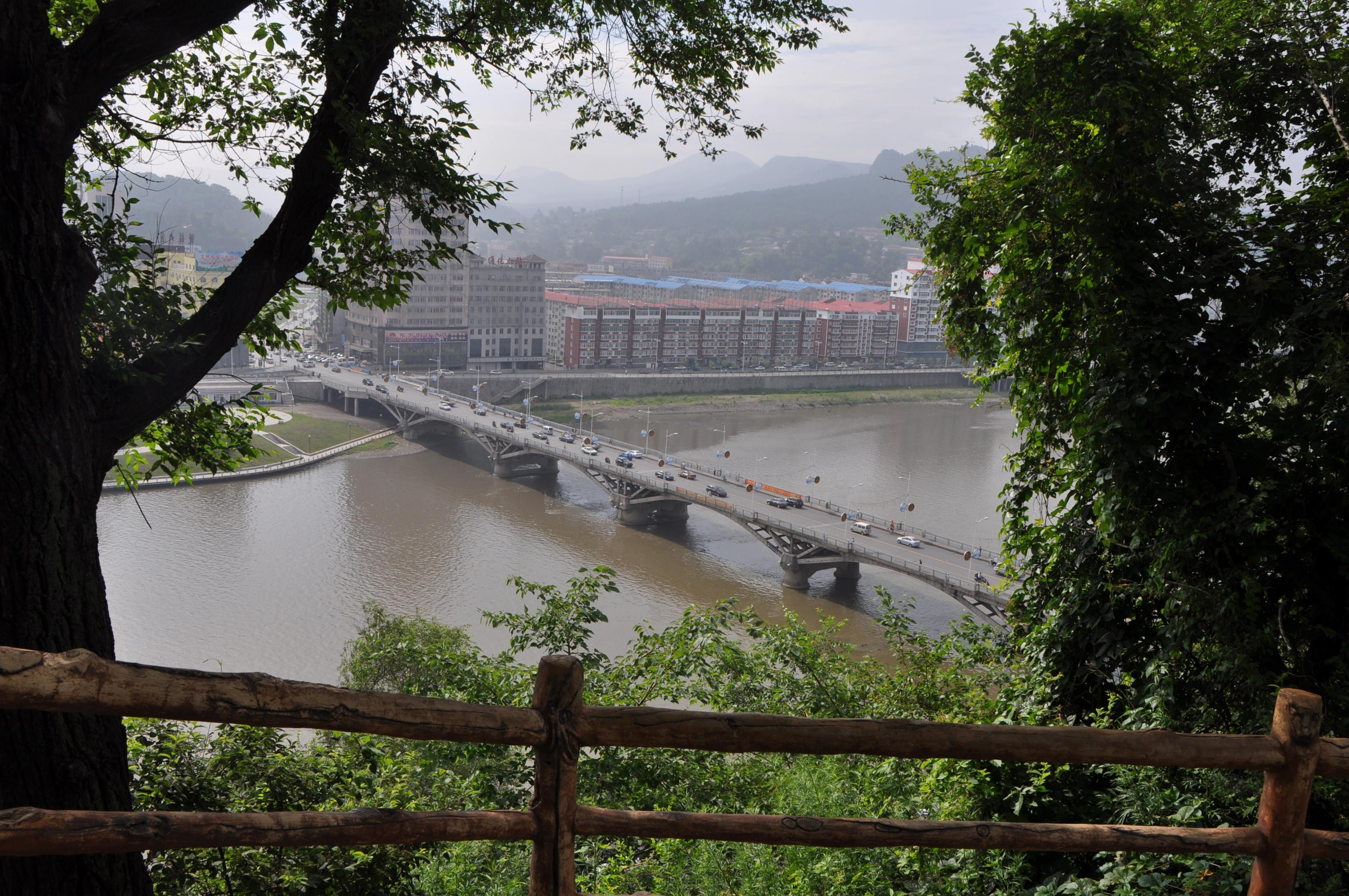
Overlooking the Hun River from Yuhuangshan Park in Tonghua.

The Hun River (Chinese: 浑江; pinyin: Hún Jiāng) in Northeast China is the largest tributary on the right (Chinese) side of the Yalu River. It starts in the Longgang mountains of northwest Jiangyuan District, Baishan, Jilin Province, runs 446.5 kilometres through Tonghua and Huanren Manchu Autonomous County of Liaoning Province, and empties into the Yalu River at Hunjiang Village of Kuandian Manchu Autonomous County.

== Name ==
The Hun River Basin is the place of origin of the Manchu Tunggiya clan. Thus the river is known as the Tunggiya ula in the Manchu language.

== History ==
The Hun River's drainage basin is the birthplace of the Goguryeo.
