= Erdaojiang, Tonghua =

Erdaojiang 二道江区
- District
- Location of Erdaojiang District (red) in Tonghua (yellow)

- Location in Jilin
- Coordinates: 41°46′26″N 126°02′33″E
- Country: People's Republic of China
- Province: Jilin
- Prefecture-level city: Tonghua
- Time zone: UTC+8 (China Standard)

Erdaojiang District (simplified Chinese: 二道江区; traditional Chinese: 二道江區; pinyin: Èrdàojiāng Qū) is a district of Tonghua, Jilin, China.

== Administrative Divisions ==
Subdistricts:

- East Tonghua Subdistrict (东通化街道), Taoyuan Subdistrict (桃园街道)

Towns:

- Wudaojiang (五道江镇), Tiechang (铁厂镇), Yayuan (鸭园镇)

The only township is Erdaojiang Township (二道江乡)
