= Hunjiang, Baishan =

Hunjiang 浑江区
- District
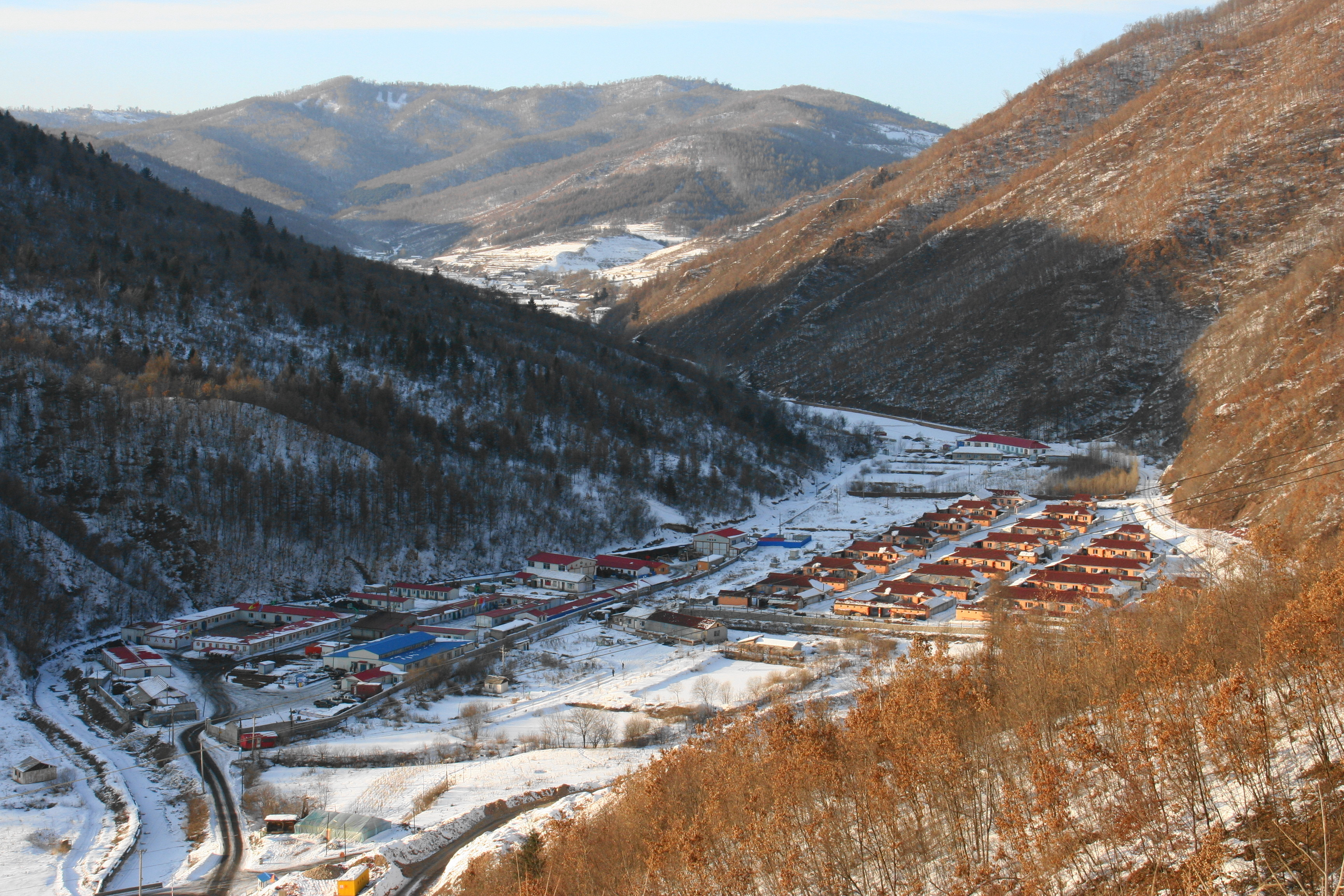

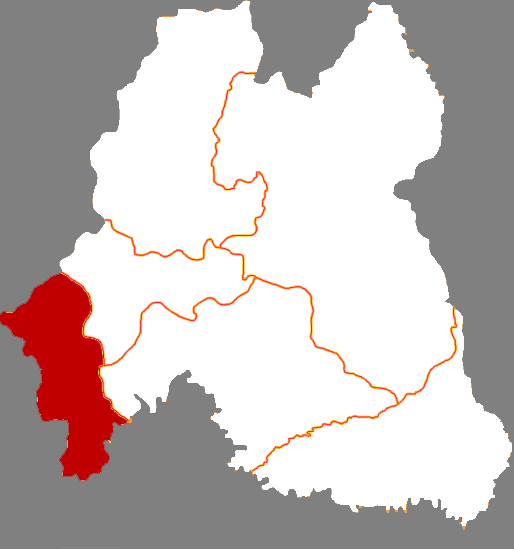
- Location in Baishan

- Location in Jilin
- Coordinates: 41°56′43″N 126°24′58″E
- Country: China
- Province: Jilin
- Prefecture-level city: Baishan
- District seat: Xinjian Subdistrict

Area
  - Total: 1,381.88 km^{2} (533.55 sq mi)

Population (2020 census)
  - Total: 307,982
  - Density: 222.872/km^{2} (577.235/sq mi)
- Time zone: UTC+8 (China Standard)
- Division code: HJH
- Website: www.hunjiang.gov.cn

Hunjiang District (simplified Chinese: 浑江区; traditional Chinese: 渾江區; pinyin: Húnjiāng Qū) is a district of the city of Baishan, Jilin, China. It was known as Badaojiang District (八道江区) until 22 February 2010, when the State Council approved the name change.

== Administrative Divisions ==
There are eight subdistricts and four towns.

Subdistricts:

- Xinjian Subdistrict (新建街道), Tonggou Subdistrict (通沟街道), Dongxing Subdistrict (东兴街道), Hongqi Subdistrict (红旗街道), Banshi Subdistrict (板石街道), Hekou Subdistrict (河口街道), Chengnan Subdistrict (城南街道), Jiangbei Subdistrict (江北街道)

Towns:

- Qidaojiang (七道江镇), Liudaojiang (六道江镇), Hongtuya (红土崖镇), Sandaogou (三道沟镇)
