= Liuhe County =

Liuhe County 柳河县
- County
- Location of Liuhe County (red) in Tonghua (yellow)

- Location in Jilin province
- Coordinates: 42°17′N 125°45′E
- Country: People's Republic of China
- Province: Jilin
- Prefecture-level city: Tonghua
- County seat: Liuhe Town (柳河镇)

Area
  - Total: 3,348 km^{2} (1,293 sq mi)
- Elevation: 419 m (1,375 ft)

Population
  - Total: 360,000
  - Density: 110/km^{2} (280/sq mi)
- Time zone: UTC+8 (China Standard)
- Postal code: 135300

Liuhe (Chinese: 柳河; pinyin: Liǔhé) is a county of southwestern Jilin province, China, bordering Liaoning province to the southwest. It is under the administration of Tonghua City, with a population of 360,000 residing in an area of 3,348 km^{2} (1,293 sq mi).

== Administrative divisions ==
There are 11 towns, one ethnic town, and three townships.

Towns:

- Liuhe (柳河镇)
- Gushanzi (孤山子镇)
- Wudaogou (五道沟镇)
- Tuoyaoling (驼腰岭镇)
- Sanyuanpu Korean Town (三源浦朝鲜族镇)
- Shengshui (圣水镇)
- Liangshuihezi (凉水河子镇)
- Luotongshan (罗通山镇)
- Ankou (安口镇)
- Xiangyang (向阳镇)
- Hongshi (红石镇)
- Hengtong (亨通镇)

Townships:

- Shijiadian Township (时家店乡)
- Liunan Township (柳南乡)
- Jiangjiadian Korean Ethnic Township (姜家店朝鲜族乡)

== Climate ==
Climate data for Liuhe, elevation 362 m (1,188 ft), (1991–2020 normals, extremes 1981–2010)
| Month | Jan | Feb | Mar | Apr | May | Jun | Jul | Aug | Sep | Oct | Nov | Dec | Year |
|---|---|---|---|---|---|---|---|---|---|---|---|---|---|
| Record high °C (°F) | 5.7 (42.3) | 13.3 (55.9) | 18.3 (64.9) | 29.8 (85.6) | 33.5 (92.3) | 34.7 (94.5) | 36.1 (97.0) | 35.1 (95.2) | 29.9 (85.8) | 27.5 (81.5) | 19.4 (66.9) | 10.2 (50.4) | 36.1 (97.0) |
| Mean daily maximum °C (°F) | −7.0 (19.4) | −2.4 (27.7) | 4.9 (40.8) | 14.6 (58.3) | 21.7 (71.1) | 25.8 (78.4) | 27.9 (82.2) | 26.9 (80.4) | 22.2 (72.0) | 14.5 (58.1) | 3.5 (38.3) | −4.8 (23.4) | 12.3 (54.2) |
| Daily mean °C (°F) | −14.4 (6.1) | −9.5 (14.9) | −1.1 (30.0) | 8.1 (46.6) | 15.3 (59.5) | 20.1 (68.2) | 23.0 (73.4) | 21.5 (70.7) | 15.3 (59.5) | 7.4 (45.3) | −2.2 (28.0) | −11.2 (11.8) | 6.0 (42.8) |
| Mean daily minimum °C (°F) | −20.3 (−4.5) | −15.7 (3.7) | −6.6 (20.1) | 1.8 (35.2) | 9.0 (48.2) | 14.9 (58.8) | 18.6 (65.5) | 17.1 (62.8) | 9.6 (49.3) | 1.5 (34.7) | −7.3 (18.9) | −16.7 (1.9) | 0.5 (32.9) |
| Record low °C (°F) | −38.6 (−37.5) | −34.8 (−30.6) | −25.9 (−14.6) | −12.6 (9.3) | −3.7 (25.3) | 4.6 (40.3) | 9.2 (48.6) | 3.7 (38.7) | −4.5 (23.9) | −12.5 (9.5) | −27.3 (−17.1) | −33.0 (−27.4) | −38.6 (−37.5) |
| Average precipitation mm (inches) | 7.7 (0.30) | 11.7 (0.46) | 22.8 (0.90) | 39.2 (1.54) | 69.8 (2.75) | 95.1 (3.74) | 172.4 (6.79) | 177.0 (6.97) | 64.3 (2.53) | 44.5 (1.75) | 30.7 (1.21) | 12.2 (0.48) | 747.4 (29.42) |
| Average precipitation days (≥ 0.1 mm) | 7.1 | 5.9 | 7.4 | 9.0 | 12.1 | 14.3 | 14.8 | 14.3 | 9.0 | 8.7 | 8.6 | 7.7 | 118.9 |
| Average snowy days | 9.3 | 7.6 | 8.4 | 3.3 | 0 | 0 | 0 | 0 | 0 | 1.7 | 7.6 | 9.5 | 47.4 |
| Average relative humidity (%) | 67 | 63 | 59 | 53 | 58 | 68 | 78 | 80 | 75 | 67 | 68 | 68 | 67 |
| Mean monthly sunshine hours | 166.8 | 180.0 | 212.5 | 209.2 | 233.3 | 218.9 | 195.7 | 196.5 | 209.8 | 194.6 | 155.4 | 151.0 | 2,323.7 |
| Percentage possible sunshine | 57 | 60 | 57 | 52 | 52 | 48 | 43 | 46 | 57 | 58 | 54 | 54 | 53 |
Source: China Meteorological Administration
