= Tonghua =

Tonghua 通化市 T'ung-hua
- Prefecture-level city
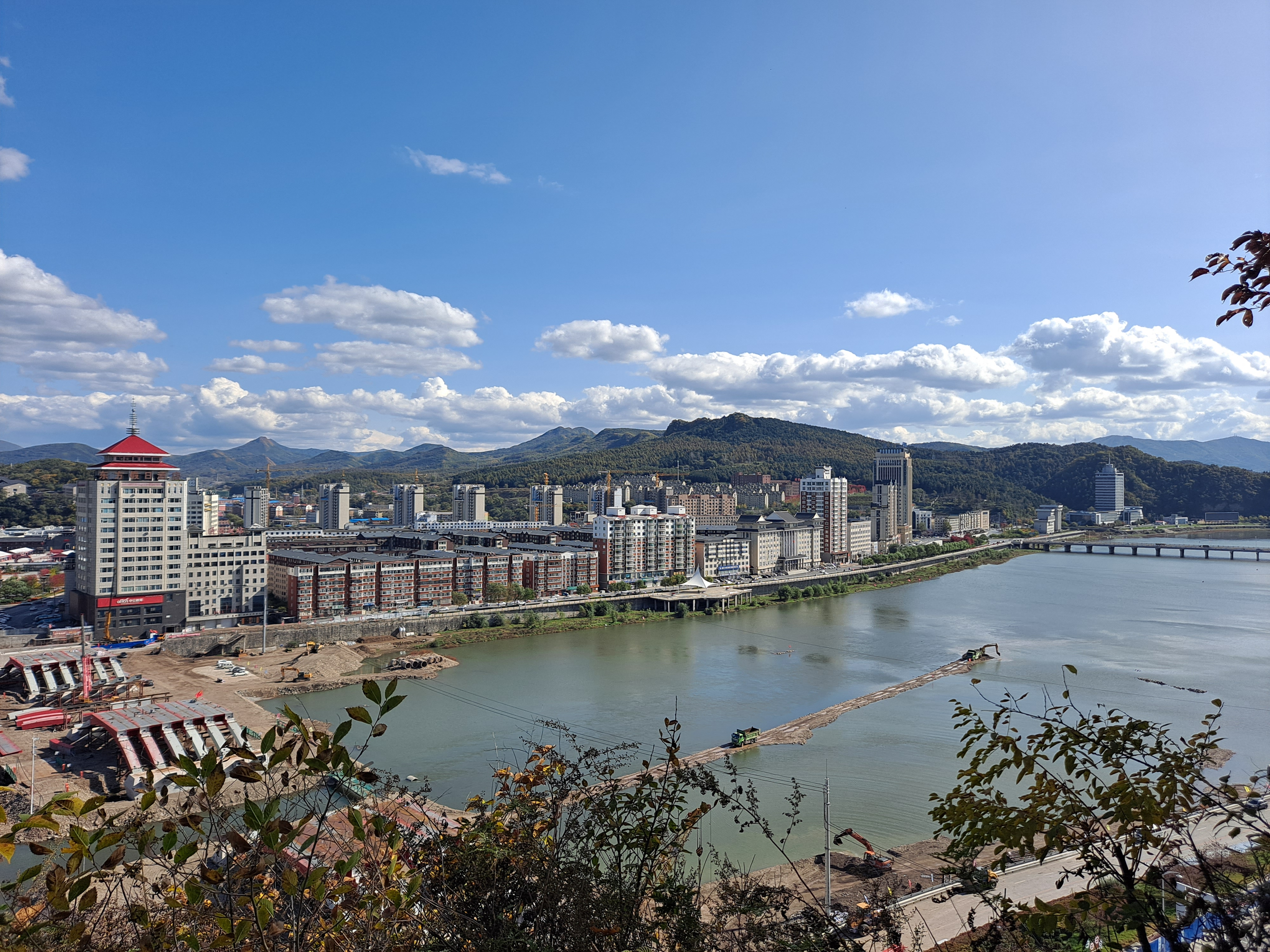
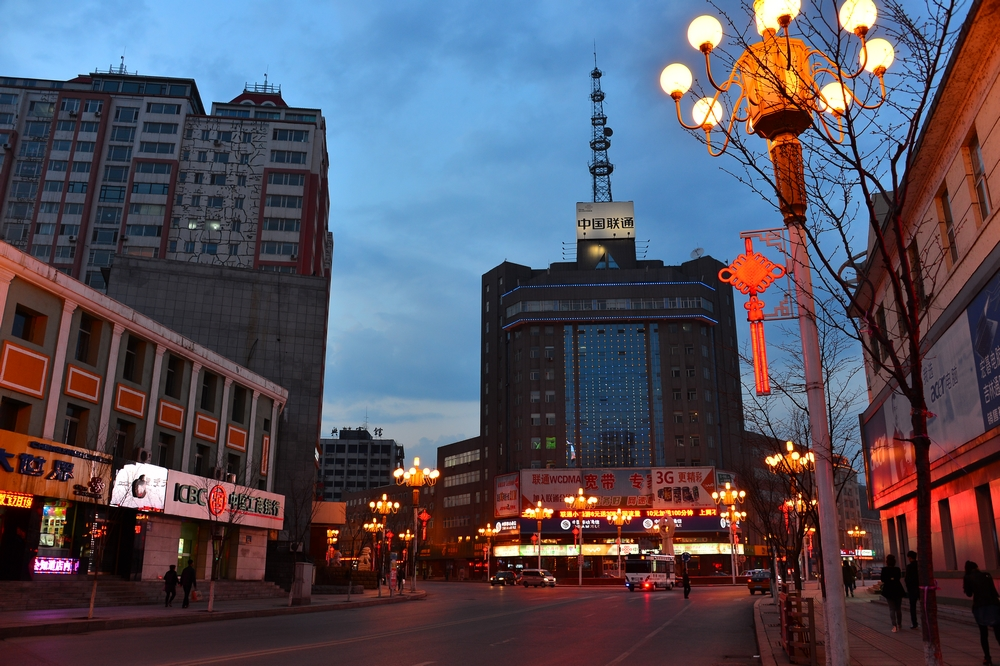
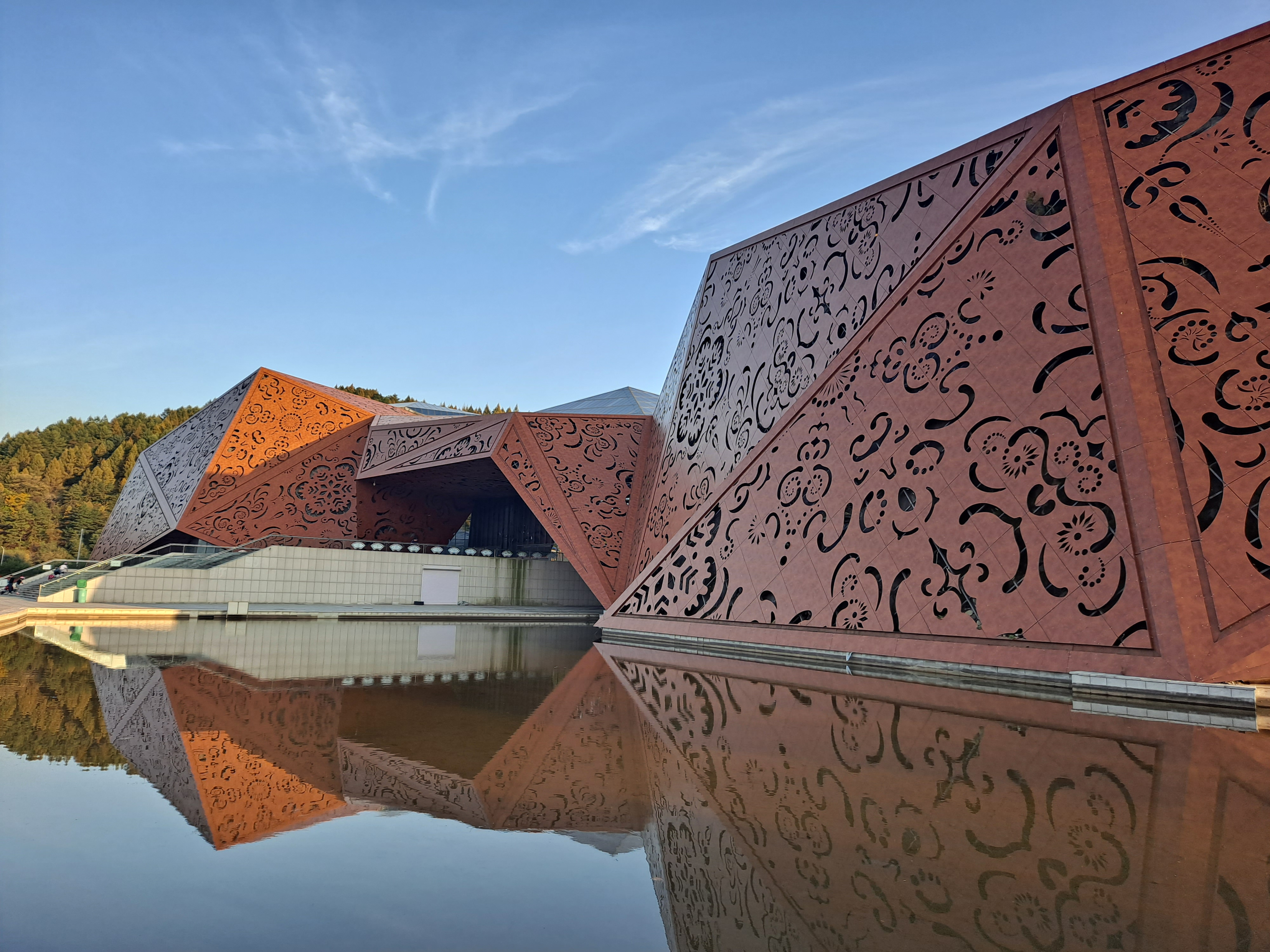
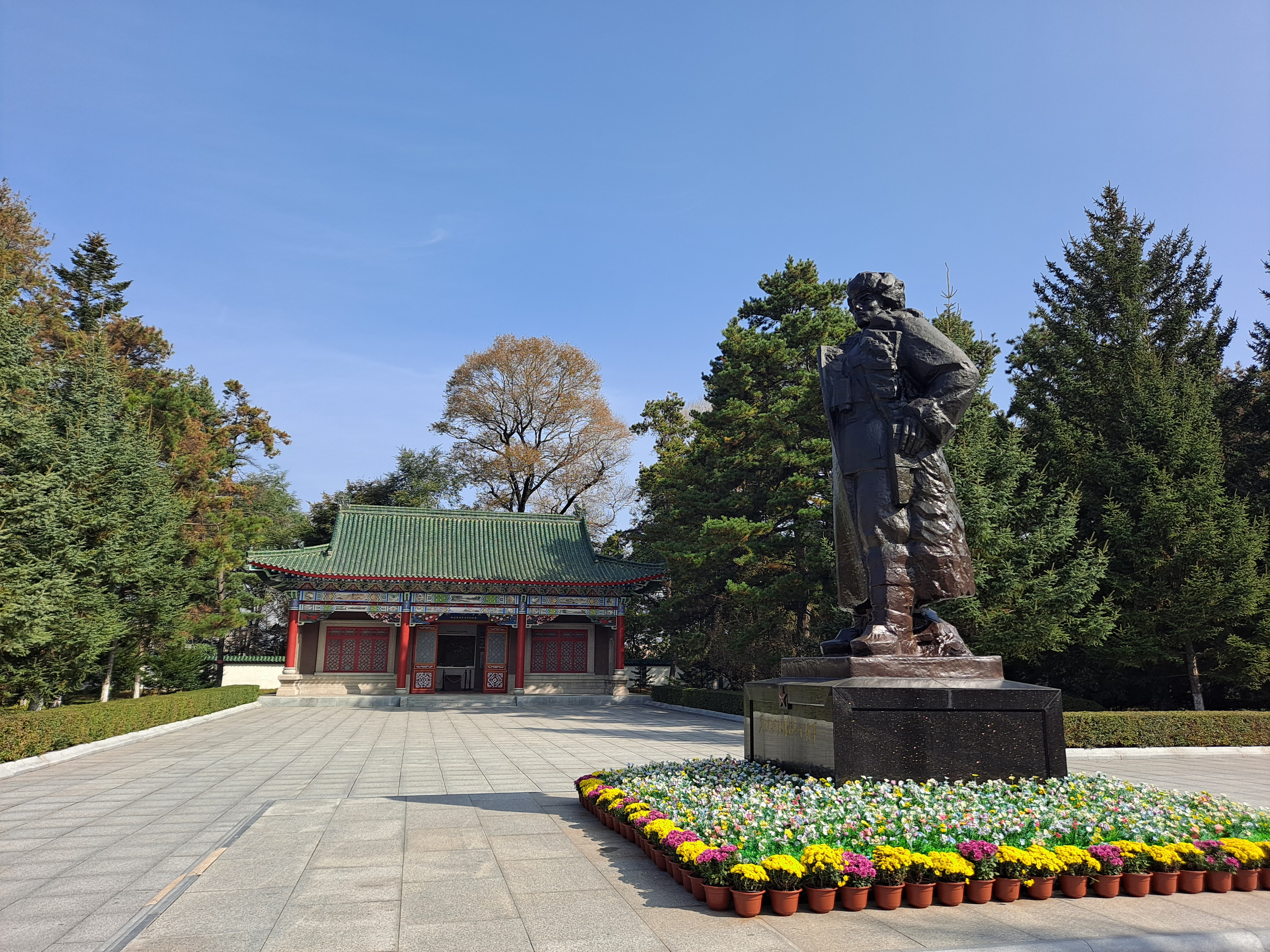
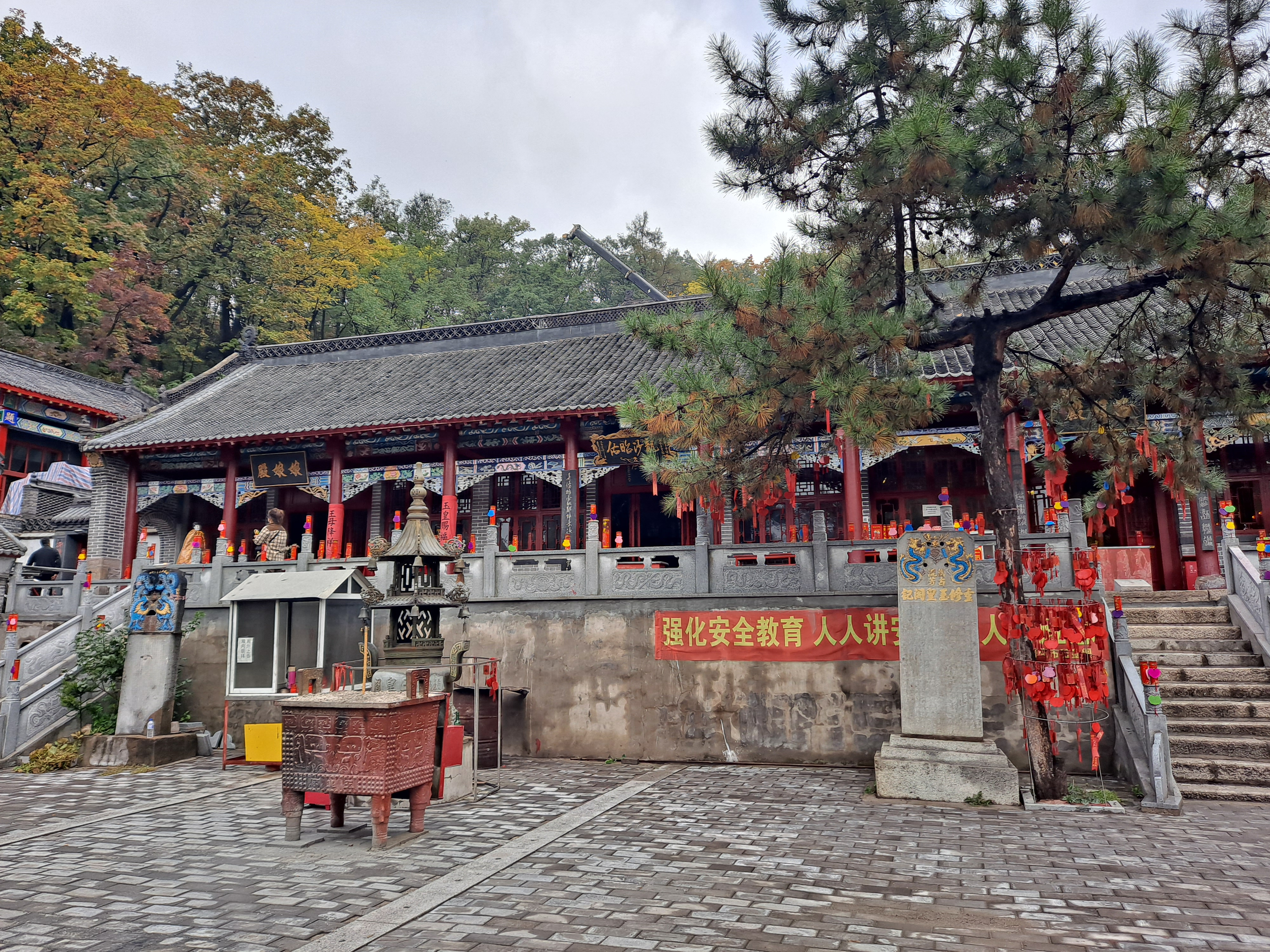
- From top, left to right: View from Yuhuang Mountain; Night Street in Dongchang; Tonghua Science and Culture Center; Yang Jingyu Memorial Park; Yuhuang Temple

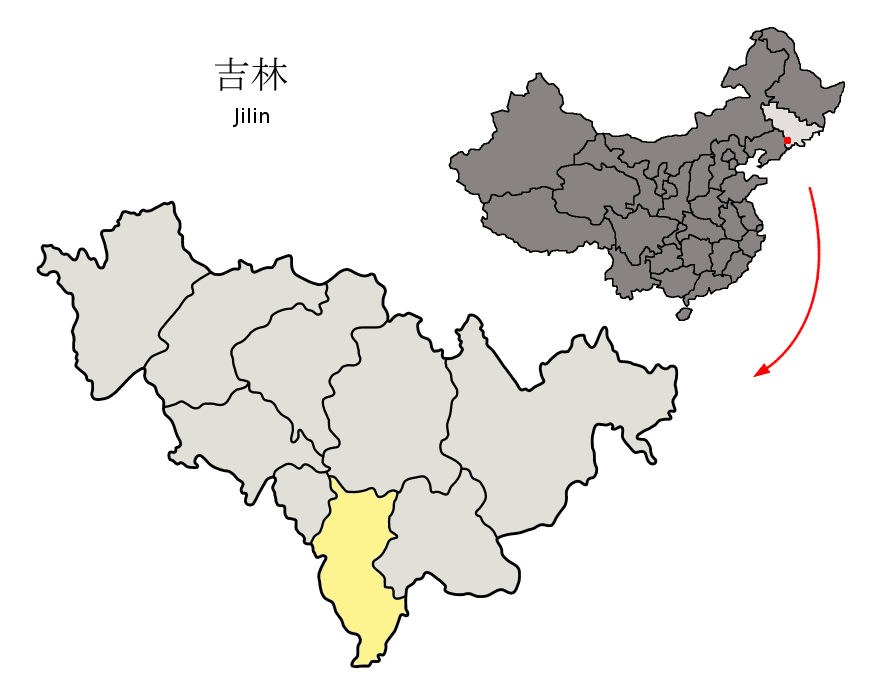
- Location of Tonghua City (yellow) in Jilin (light grey) and China

- Location of the city centre in Jilin
- Coordinates (Tonghua government): 41°43′42″N 125°56′23″E
- Country: People's Republic of China
- Province: Jilin
- County-level divisions: 7
- Municipal seat: Dongchang District

Government
  - Type: Prefecture-level city
  - CPC Tonghua Secretary: Liu Baowei (刘保威)
  - Mayor: Tian Yulin (田玉林)

Area
  - Prefecture-level city: 15,195 km^{2} (5,867 sq mi)
  - Urban: 761 km^{2} (294 sq mi)
  - Metro: 761 km^{2} (294 sq mi)
- Elevation: 374 m (1,227 ft)

Population (2020 census)
  - Prefecture-level city: 1,812,114
  - Density: 119.26/km^{2} (308.87/sq mi)
  - Urban: 446,917
  - Urban density: 587/km^{2} (1,520/sq mi)
  - Metro: 446,917
  - Metro density: 587/km^{2} (1,520/sq mi)

GDP
  - Prefecture-level city: CN¥ 100 billion US$ 16.1 billion
  - Per capita: CN¥ 45,171; US$ 7,252
- Time zone: UTC+8 (China Standard)
- Postal code: 134000
- Area code: 0435
- ISO 3166 code: CN-JL-05
- Licence plate prefixes: 吉E
- Website: tonghua.gov.cn

Tonghua
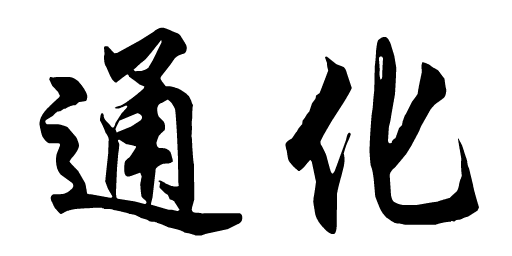
- "Tonghua", as written in Chinese
- Chinese: 通化
- Postal: Tunghwa
Transcriptions
Standard Mandarin
- Hanyu Pinyin: Tōnghuà
- Wade–Giles: T'ung^{1}-hua^{4}

Tonghua (Chinese: 通化; pinyin: Tōnghuà) is a prefecture-level city in the south of Jilin province, People's Republic of China. It borders North Korea's Chagang Province to the south and southeast, Baishan to the east, Jilin City to the north, Liaoyuan to the northwest, and Liaoning province to the west and southwest. Its population was 1,812,114 registered residents at the 2020 census living in an area of 15,195 square kilometres (5,867 sq mi). Its built-up (or metro) area made of the two urban districts was home to 446,917 inhabitants. It is known as one of the five medicine production centres in China.

== History ==
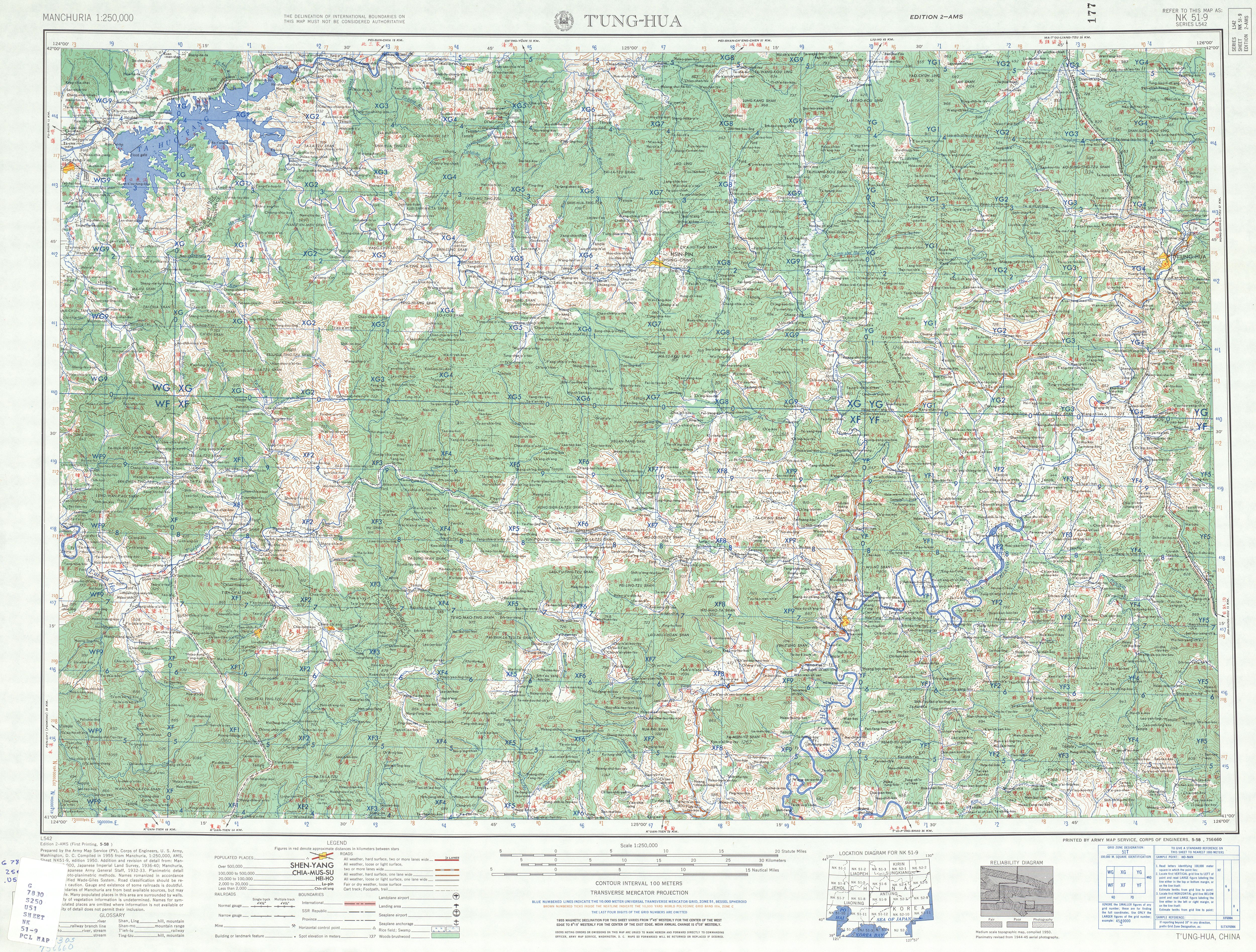
Map including Tonghua (labeled as T'UNG-HUA 通化) (AMS, 1955)

Human settlement in the Tonghua area dates from about 6,000 years ago. In the Western Han Dynasty, Tonghua belonged to the Liaodong Fourth Commandery (遼東四郡).

Tonghua was the birthplace of Goguryeo culture and shaman culture. The Goguryeo kingdom established its capital at Gungnae in 425 A.D., which, together with the Tombs of the Ancient Gogoryeo Kingdom, represents the only successful, independent submission to become a UNESCO World Heritage Site.

Under the Japanese occupation of Manchuria after 1932, a railway was constructed linking Tonghua with the main Manchurian rail network and with northern Korea.

During the Second Sino-Japanese War, Yang Jingyu led the First Army of the Northeast Anti-Japanese United Army to battle the Imperial Japanese Army, and was killed in battle.

In August 1945 Tonghua briefly served as the temporary capital of Manchukuo, where Puyi claimed to abdicate at the behest of the Kwantung Army. In 1985, Tonghua became a prefecture-level city under the approval of the State Council.

The city has a recent record of extreme violence including the Shosankoku incident in 1945, the Tonghua Incident in 1946 and the Tonghua Iron and Steel Group riot in 2009.

== Administrative divisions ==
Map
#	Name	Hanzi	Hanyu Pinyin	Population (2010 est.)	Area (km^{2})	Density (/km^{2})
1	Dongchang District	东昌区	Dōngchāng Qū	360,195	383	940
2	Erdaojiang District	二道江区	Èrdàojiāng Qū	146,682	378	388
3	Meihekou City	梅河口市	Méihékǒu Shì	615,367	2,175	283
4	Ji'an City	集安市	Jí'ān Shì	232,358	3,408	68
5	Tonghua County	通化县	Tōnghuà Xiàn	247,225	3,729	66
6	Huinan County	辉南县	Huīnán Xiàn	359,453	2,277	158
7	Liuhe County	柳河县	Liǔhé Xiàn	363,962	3,348	109

== Geography ==
=== Climate ===
Tonghua has a monsoon-influenced, humid continental climate (Köppen Dwa), with long, very cold, windy, but dry winters and hot, humid summers; spring and autumn are brief. The monthly 24-hour average temperature ranges from −13.9 °C (7.0 °F) in January to 22.3 °C (72.1 °F) in July; the annual mean is 6.0 °C (42.8 °F). During the warmer months, rainfall is enhanced by the mountainous topography, allowing for a generous annual precipitation total of 893.44 millimetres (35.2 in). However, the monsoon still means that more than 60% of the annual precipitation falls from June to August alone.

Climate data for Tonghua, elevation 403 m (1,322 ft), (1991–2020 normals, extremes 1971–2025)
Month	Jan	Feb	Mar	Apr	May	Jun	Jul	Aug	Sep	Oct	Nov	Dec	Year
Record high °C (°F)	4.7 (40.5)	12.6 (54.7)	22.3 (72.1)	28.7 (83.7)	32.3 (90.1)	34.9 (94.8)	35.6 (96.1)	35.3 (95.5)	30.7 (87.3)	26.4 (79.5)	18.3 (64.9)	8.9 (48.0)	35.6 (96.1)
Mean daily maximum °C (°F)	−6.1 (21.0)	−1.6 (29.1)	5.4 (41.7)	14.7 (58.5)	21.5 (70.7)	25.4 (77.7)	27.8 (82.0)	27.1 (80.8)	22.3 (72.1)	14.6 (58.3)	4.0 (39.2)	−4.3 (24.3)	12.6 (54.6)
Daily mean °C (°F)	−13.3 (8.1)	−8.5 (16.7)	−0.6 (30.9)	8.2 (46.8)	14.9 (58.8)	19.6 (67.3)	22.8 (73.0)	21.6 (70.9)	15.3 (59.5)	7.4 (45.3)	−1.8 (28.8)	−10.5 (13.1)	6.3 (43.3)
Mean daily minimum °C (°F)	−18.8 (−1.8)	−14.3 (6.3)	−5.8 (21.6)	2.3 (36.1)	8.8 (47.8)	14.6 (58.3)	19.0 (66.2)	17.8 (64.0)	10.6 (51.1)	1.9 (35.4)	−6.4 (20.5)	−15.6 (3.9)	1.2 (34.1)
Record low °C (°F)	−33.4 (−28.1)	−31.8 (−25.2)	−27.6 (−17.7)	−12.8 (9.0)	−3.8 (25.2)	5.2 (41.4)	10.3 (50.5)	5.0 (41.0)	−2.8 (27.0)	−11.5 (11.3)	−25.3 (−13.5)	−32.1 (−25.8)	−33.4 (−28.1)
Average precipitation mm (inches)	8.4 (0.33)	14.7 (0.58)	23.9 (0.94)	49.2 (1.94)	82.7 (3.26)	109.9 (4.33)	204.9 (8.07)	213.7 (8.41)	67.2 (2.65)	50.1 (1.97)	39.1 (1.54)	13.6 (0.54)	877.4 (34.56)
Average precipitation days (≥ 0.1 mm)	7.0	6.8	8.2	9.6	12.7	14.7	15.3	13.8	8.3	9.2	9.5	8.5	123.6
Average snowy days	11.5	9.7	10.2	3.8	0.1	0	0	0	0	2.2	9.7	12.8	60
Average relative humidity (%)	66	61	56	52	59	70	77	80	75	67	68	68	67
Mean monthly sunshine hours	160.3	181.1	216.1	216.9	235.0	214.7	191.7	194.2	201.4	194.5	149.5	140.4	2,295.8
Percentage possible sunshine	54	60	58	54	52	47	42	46	54	57	51	50	52
Source 1: China Meteorological Administration
Source 2: Weather China

== Economy ==
Traditionally, Tonghua occupied a railhub position in a region of China noted for trade in only three agricultural commodities. These were ginseng, marten furs and deer antler products. In the 1980s Tonghua had some success with a wine distillery (see Tonghua Grape Wine) producing sweet, sticky red wines that proved popular with local consumers. From 1987 onwards a biennial wine festival was inaugurated, but this and the industry it promoted ultimately failed commercially owing to competition with joint-venture wine companies such as Dragon, who were able to produce a product that was marketable overseas. Following this failure, Tonghua industry was thrown back on its traditional agricultural products - and a few small but viable factories, including one specialising in artificial furs.

A fledgling tourist trade sought to highlight Tonghua attractions such as some ski slopes, the tomb of the local hero General Yang (a resister to the Japanese occupation of Manchukuo in the 1930s) and the Changbai Shan Nature Reserve for which Tonghua serves as a connecting railway station from the major population centres to the north and west.

Tonghua's population hovers around 300,000, but census information is difficult to assess as it includes demographic information from other towns nearby (for example, Erdaojiang - a suburb of Tonghua, and even Hunjiang, a city to the east). The inclusion of these suburbs and surrounding towns greatly swells Tonghua's official population beyond the 300,000-mark.

=== Steel ===
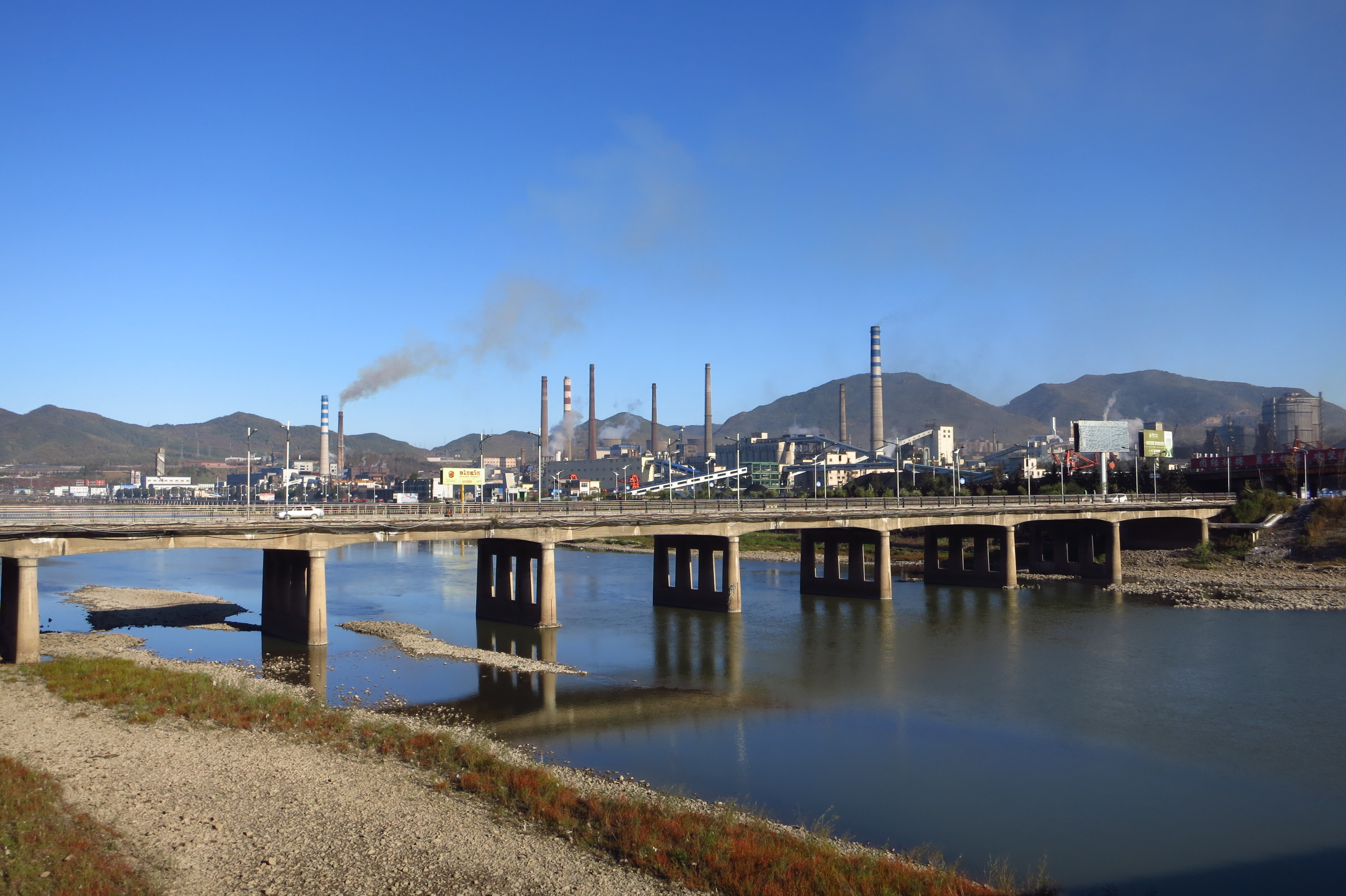
Tonghua Steel Factory

Erdaojiang District has a number of steelworks, and tens of thousands of steelworkers are employed locally. In July 2009, workers at Tonghua Iron and Steel Group rioted (See main article) at news of a takeover deal by privately owned Jianlong Steel, and the general manager of the firm was beaten to death. The unrest reportedly involved 30,000 workers, with up to 100 injured in clashes with police. The takeover was promptly scrapped.

Tonghua Iron and Steel became part of Shougang Group in 2010, and is now called Shougang Tonghua Steel Group.

=== Pharmaceuticals ===
The city of Tonghua has also become a hub for a range of Chinese pharmaceutical firms, including domestic insulin producer Tonghua Dongbao Pharmaceuticals Ltd. These companies are generally spread among the various "Industrial parks" found throughout the city, with 46 projects located in these parks in 2012 alone. Investment in Tonghua's pharmaceutical industry is on the increase, with 27 of these projects worth over 100 million Yuan. Other pharmaceutical producers in the area include Jingma, Zhenghe and Wantong Pharmaceuticals.

== Transportation ==
=== Railway ===
Railways from Shenyang to Jilin and Meihekou to Ji'an meets in Tonghua. Trains from Tonghua Railway Station connect the city with Beijing, Qingdao, Shenyang, Dalian and several other major cities in China.

=== Highway ===
Tonghua is served by G11 Hegang-Dalian Expressway.

=== Air ===
Tonghua is served by Tonghua Sanyuanpu Airport.

== Tourism ==
=== Yang Jingyu Martyrs Cemetery ===
The Yang Jingyu Martyrs Cemetery is located on the hills adjoining the Tongjiang River in Tonghua and was built to commemorate Second Sino-Japanese War war hero, Yang Jingyu. It was built in July 1954 and completed in September 1957. The cemetery covers an area of 20,000 m^{2} (220,000 sq ft). There are five buildings in the park, which are classical glazed tile buildings. The front is the mourning hall and the tomb. The four partial temples are the performance exhibition hall of General Yang Jingyu. The bronze statue of General Yang Jingyu erects on the central of the cemetery. The front of the granite base is engraved with Peng Zhen's handwriting: The National Hero Yang Jingyu.

=== Baijifeng National Forest Park ===
It is located in the southeast of Tonghua, 25 kilometers away from the urban area. The altitude of the Baiji Yaoshan in the park is 1,318 m (4,324 ft), which is the highest peak of Tonghua.

The Forest Park is dominated by natural landscapes. The total area of the park is about 1,041 hectares (2,570 acres) and the forest coverage rate is 98.7%. The main species are Korean pine, spruce, alfalfa, birch, and rare species such as yew, hedgehog, hawthorn, and magnolia. Under the canopy, there are mainly wild ginseng, ginseng, asarum and other medicinal materials.
