= Dongchang, Tonghua =

Dongchang 东昌区
- District
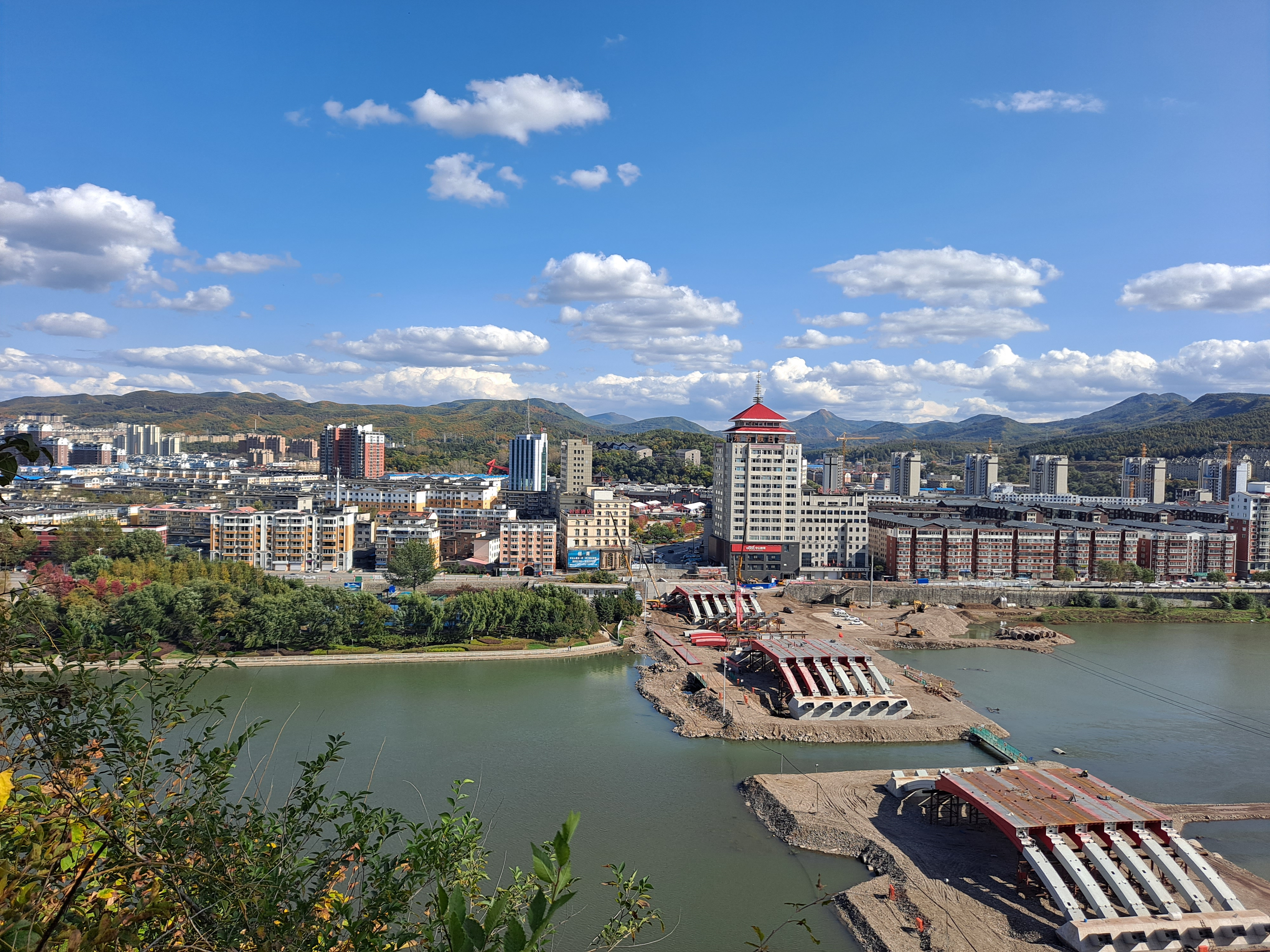

- Location of Dongchang District (red) in Tonghua (yellow)

- Location in Jilin
- Coordinates: 41°43′43″N 125°57′18″E
- Country: China
- Province: Jilin
- Prefecture-level city: Tonghua
- District seat: Minzhu Subdistrict

Area
  - Total: 375.27 km^{2} (144.89 sq mi)

Population (2020 census)
  - Total: 1,812,114
  - Density: 4,828.8/km^{2} (12,507/sq mi)
- Time zone: UTC+8 (China Standard)
- Website: www.dc.gov.cn

Dongchang District (simplified Chinese: 东昌区; traditional Chinese: 東昌區; pinyin: Dōngchāng Qū; lit. 'eastern good') is a district of the city of Tonghua, Jilin, China.

== Administrative divisions ==
There are 9 subdistricts, 1 town and 2 townships.

- Dongchang Subdistrict (东昌街道)
- Minzhu Subdistrict (民主街道)
- Laozhan Subdistrict (老站街道)
- Tuanjie Subdistrict (团结街道)
- Xinzhan Subdistrict (新站街道)
- Guangming Subdistrict (光明街道)
- Longquan Subdistrict (龙泉街道)
- Binjiang Subdistrict (滨江街道)
- Jinchang Town (金厂镇)
- Huangtong Township (环通乡)
- Jiangdong Township (江东乡)
