= Baishan =

Baishan 白山市, 백산시
- Prefecture-level city
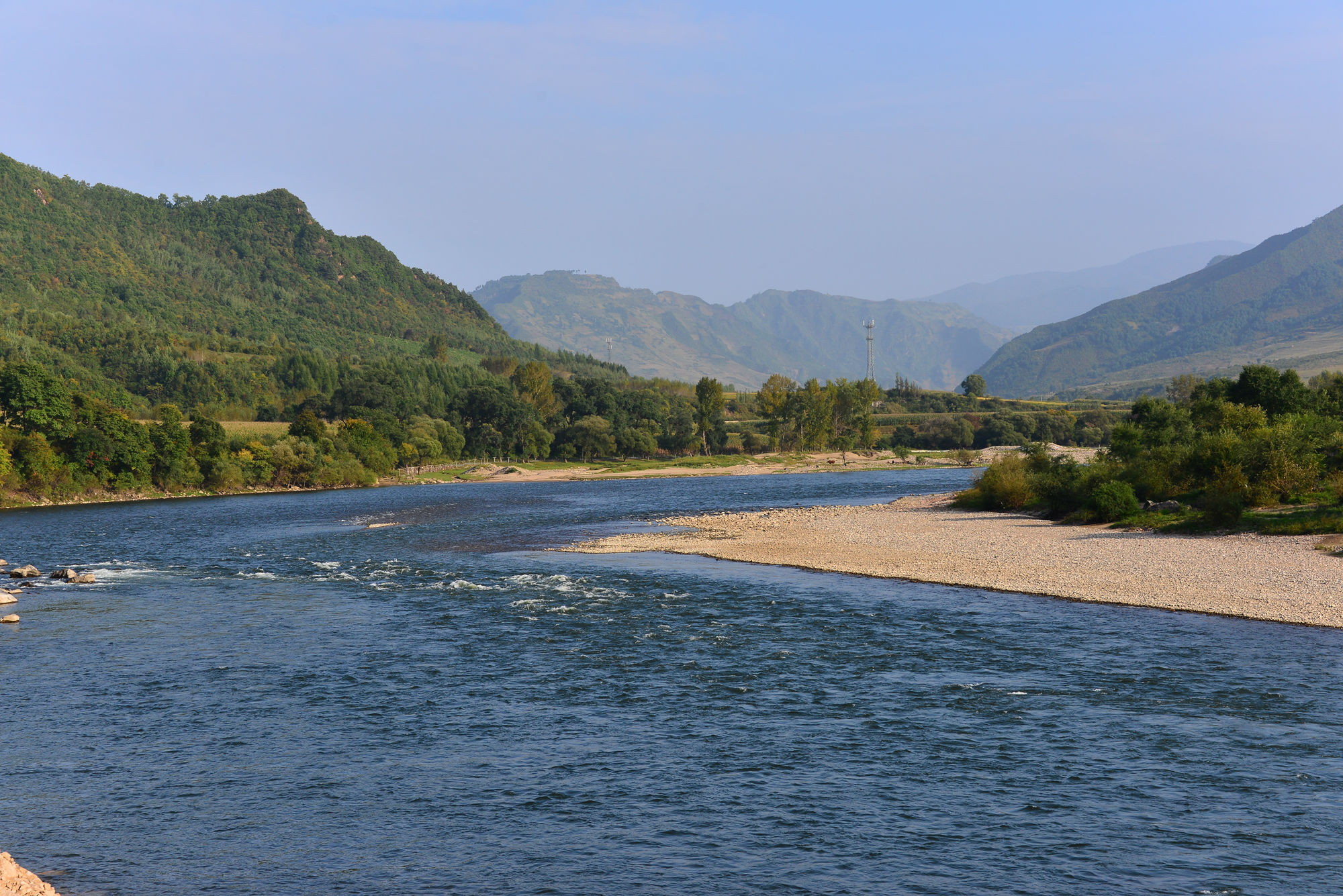
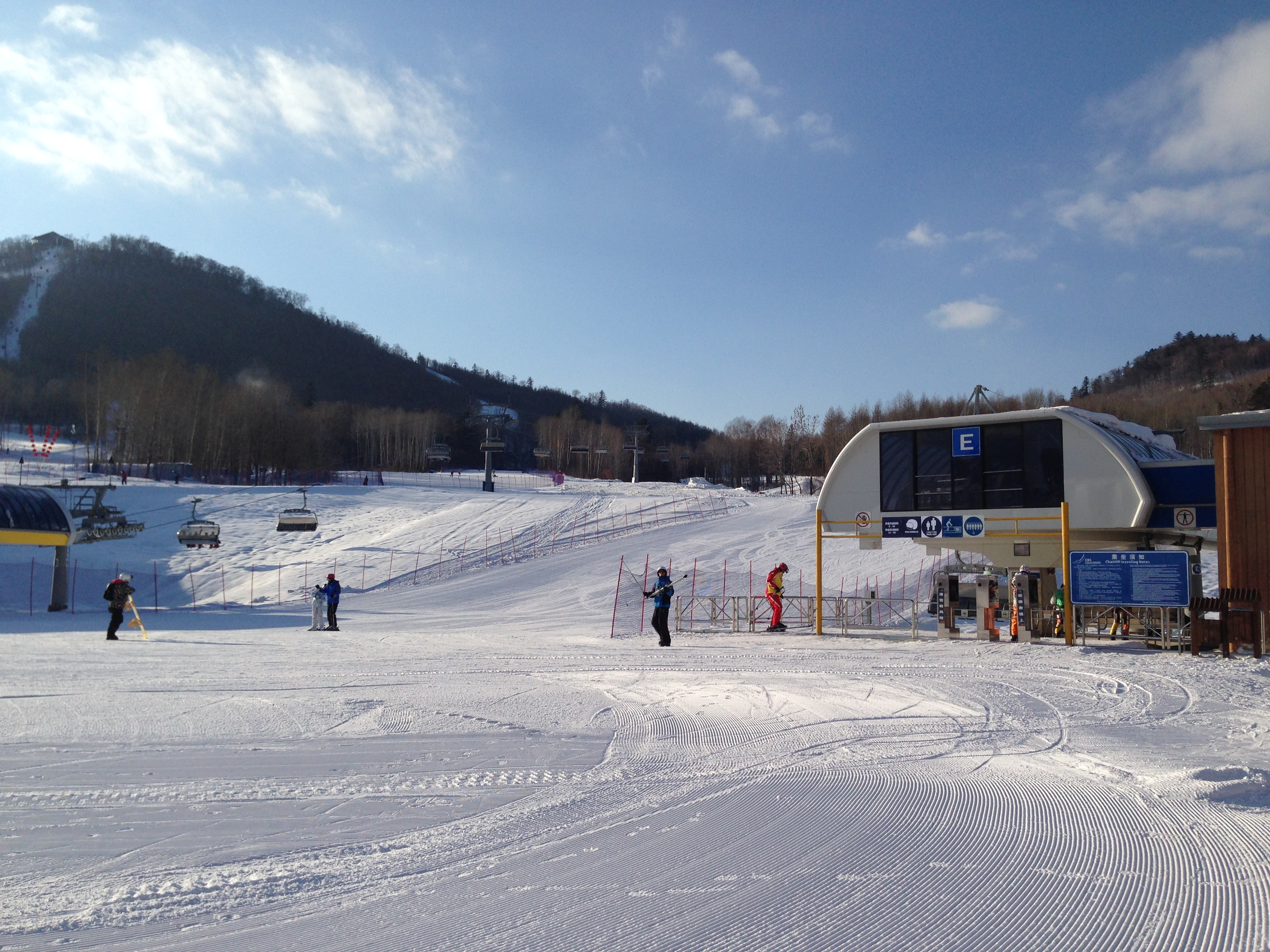
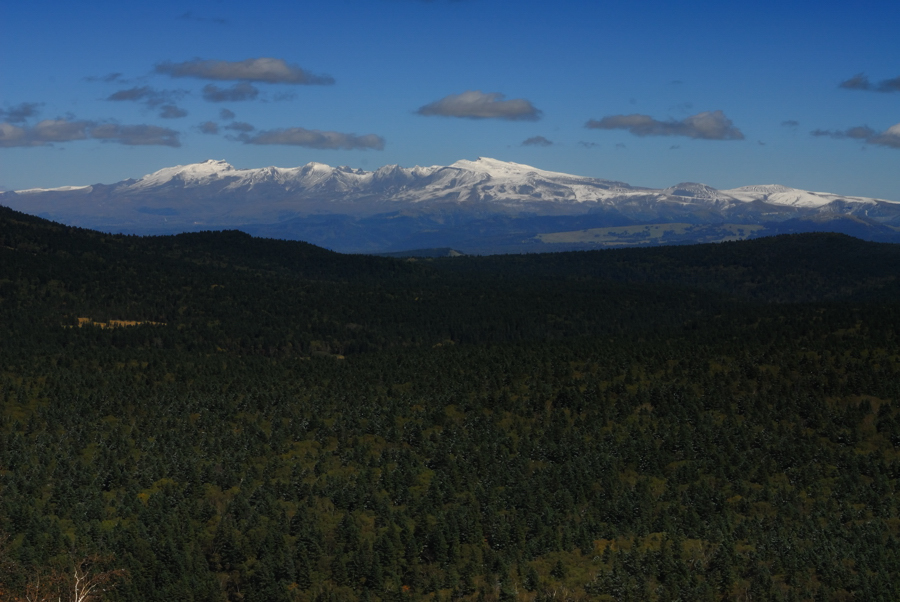
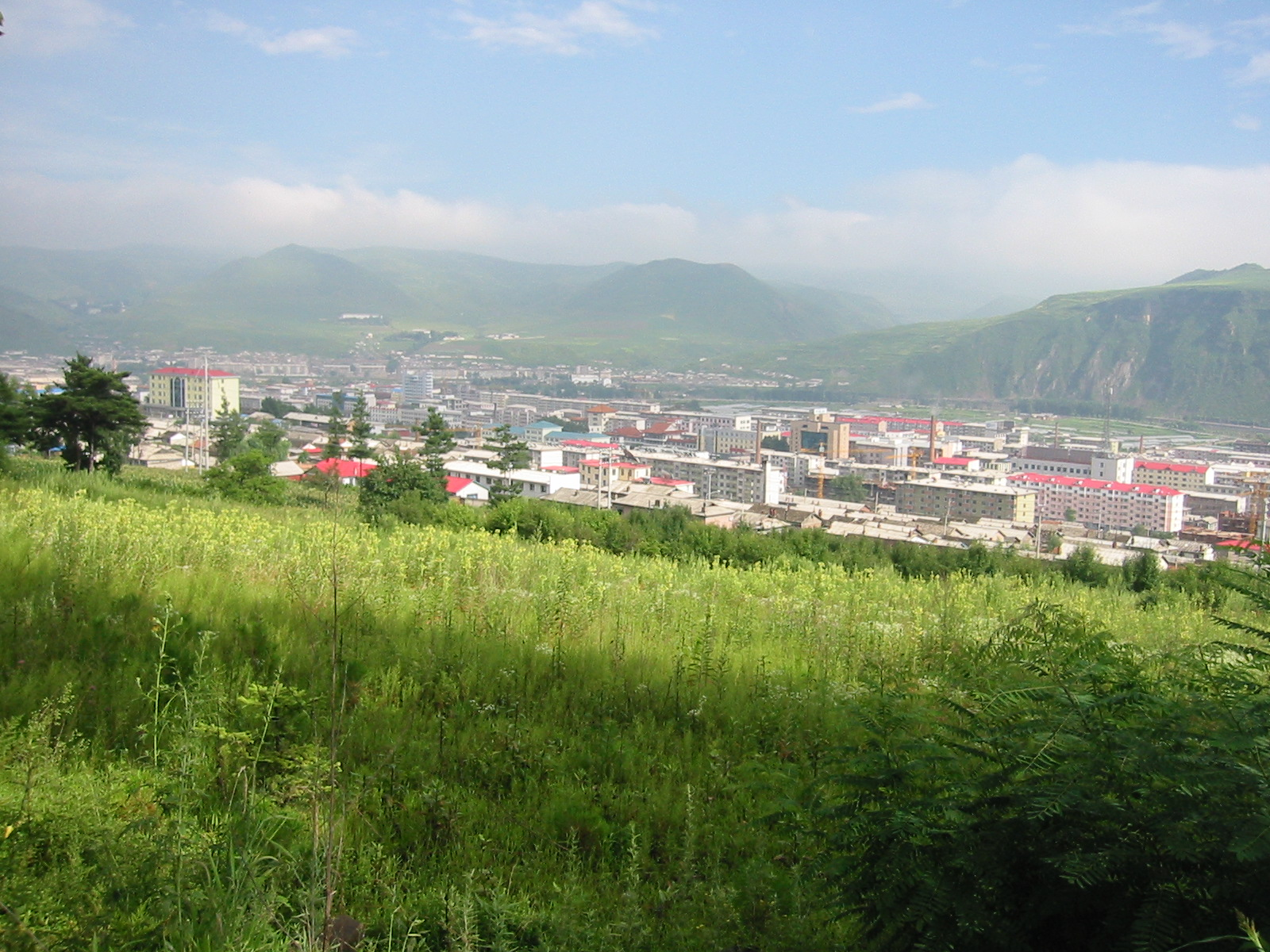
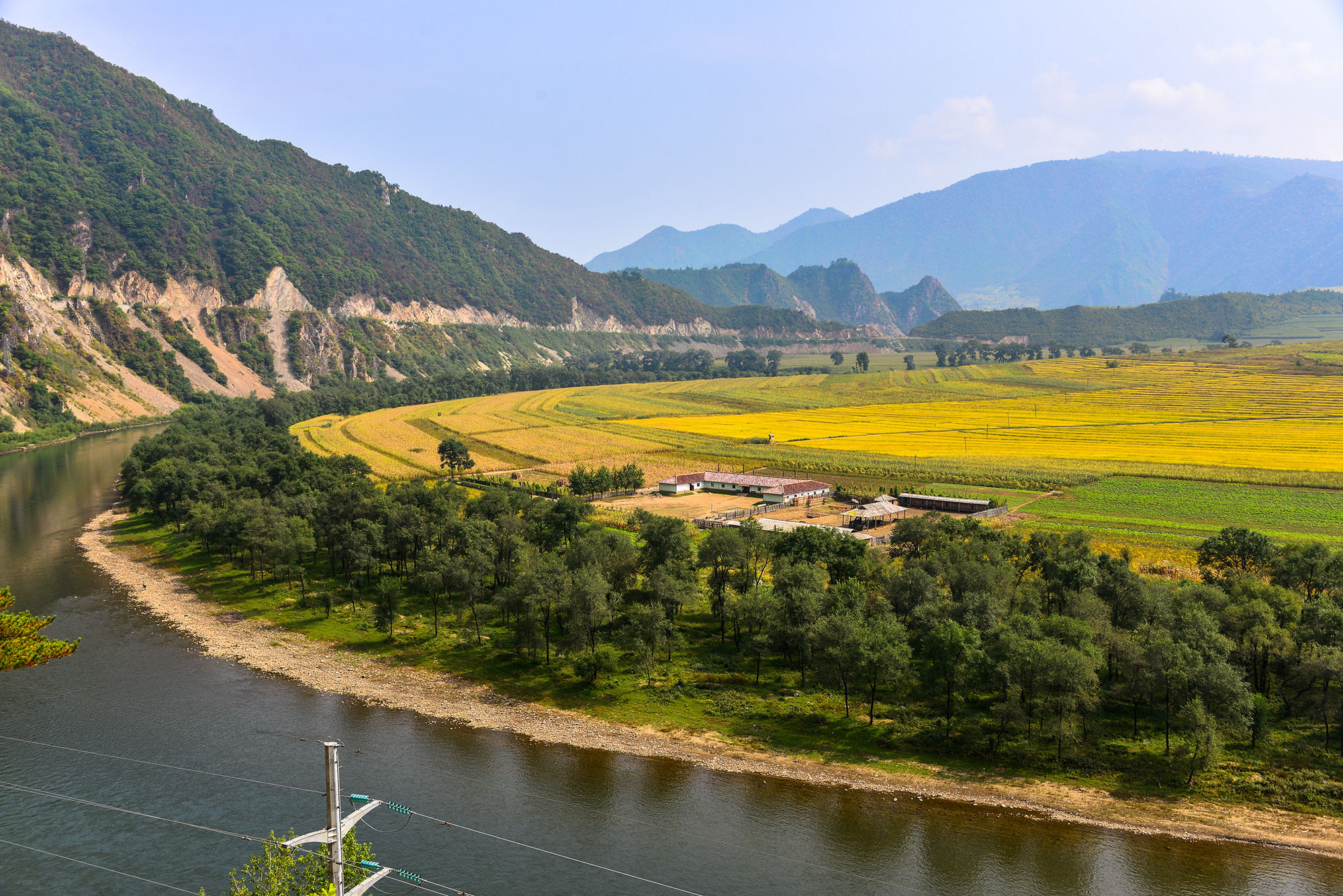
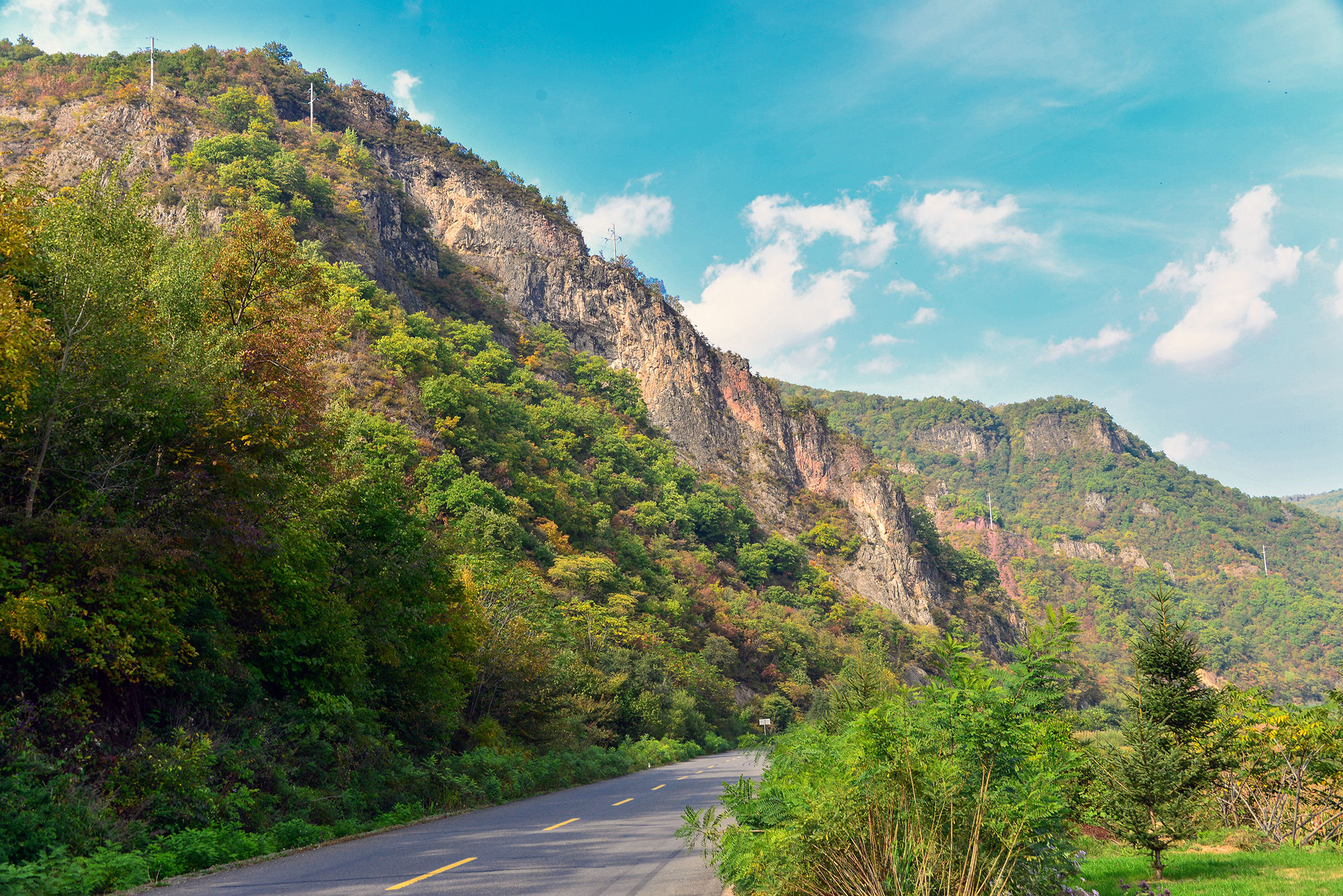
- Hun River Fusong Ski resort Fifteen Gou Changbai Korean Autonomous County Baishan Panoramio Changbai Mountain

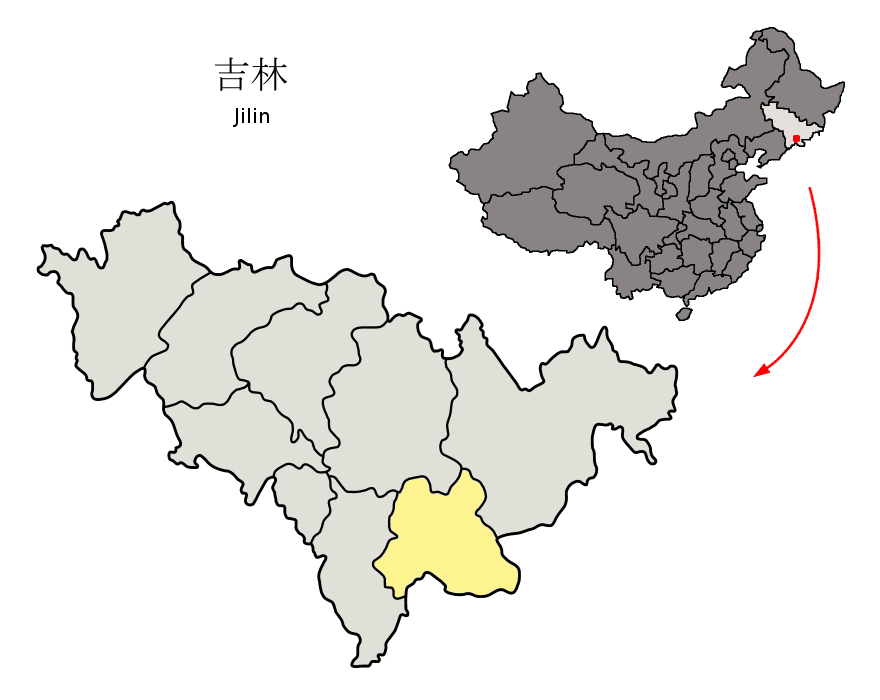
- Location of Baishan City (yellow) in Jilin (light grey) and China

- Location of the city center in Jilin
- Coordinates (Baishan municipal government): 41°56′38″N 126°24′53″E
- Country: People's Republic of China
- Province: Jilin
- County-level divisions: 6
- Incorporated (city): 8 September 1986
- Renamed: 31 January 1994
- Municipal seat: Hunjiang District

Government
  - Type: Prefecture-level city
  - CPC Committee Secretary: Xiang Hui (向辉)
  - Mayor: Wang Xuefeng (王雪峰)

Area
  - Prefecture-level city: 17,485 km^{2} (6,751 sq mi)
  - Urban (2017): 388.11 km^{2} (149.85 sq mi)
- Elevation: 471 m (1,545 ft)

Population (2010)
  - Prefecture-level city: 1,296,575
  - Density: 74.154/km^{2} (192.06/sq mi)
  - Urban (2017): 402,600
  - Urban density: 1,037/km^{2} (2,687/sq mi)

GDP
  - Prefecture-level city: CN¥ 66.9 billion US$ 10.7 billion
  - Per capita: CN¥ 53,137; US$ 8,531
- Time zone: UTC+8 (China Standard)
- Postal code: 134300
- Area code: 0439
- ISO 3166 code: CN-JL-06
- Licence plates: 吉F
- Website: bs.jl.gov.cn

Baishan (Chinese: 白山; pinyin: Báishān) is a prefecture-level city in southeastern Jilin province, in the Dongbei (northeastern) part of China. "白山" literally means "White Mountain", and is named after Changbai Mountain (Chinese: 长白山; pinyin: Chángbái Shān). Baishan borders Yanbian to the east, Tonghua to the southwest, Jilin City to the north, and North Korea to the south.

Baishan is to be granted the title of China International Mineral Water City. In Baishan is the Baishan Dam.

== History ==
In 1902, the Qing imperial government set up the Linjiang County in today's Baishan region. During the Manchukuo period, Linjiang county was under the jurisdiction of Tonghua. In March 1959, Jilin provincial government promoted Linjiang County to a county-level city and renamed it as Hunjiang City, which is still under the administration of Tonghua Prefecture. In 1985, Hunjiang City developed into a prefecture-level city, administerring three districts and three counties including Fusong, Jingyu and Changbai. The city was renamed to Baishan in April 1994 with the approval of the State Council.

== Administrative divisions ==
Map
#	Name	Hanzi	Hanyu Pinyin	Population (2003 est.)	Area (km^{2})	Density (/km^{2})
1	Hunjiang District	浑江区	Húnjiāng Qū	330,000	1,388	238
2	Jiangyuan District	江源区	Jiāngyuán Qū	260,000	1,348	193
3	Linjiang City	临江市	Línjiāng Shì	180,000	3,009	60
4	Fusong County	抚松县	Fǔsōng Xiàn	300,000	6,150	49
5	Jingyu County	靖宇县	Jìngyǔ Xiàn	140,000	3,094	45
6	Changbai Korean Autonomous County	长白朝鲜族自治县	Chángbái Cháoxiǎnzú Zìzhìxiàn	80,000	2,496	32

== Climate ==
Baishan has a humid continental climate (Köppen: Dwb, bordering on Dwa).

Climate data for Baishan, elevation 521 m (1,709 ft), (1991–2020 normals, extremes 1981–2010)
Month	Jan	Feb	Mar	Apr	May	Jun	Jul	Aug	Sep	Oct	Nov	Dec	Year
Record high °C (°F)	3.4 (38.1)	11.8 (53.2)	16.5 (61.7)	29.2 (84.6)	32.2 (90.0)	35.5 (95.9)	35.8 (96.4)	35.7 (96.3)	30.1 (86.2)	27.2 (81.0)	18.3 (64.9)	8.3 (46.9)	35.8 (96.4)
Mean daily maximum °C (°F)	−7.1 (19.2)	−2.7 (27.1)	4.3 (39.7)	13.9 (57.0)	20.7 (69.3)	24.9 (76.8)	27.3 (81.1)	26.5 (79.7)	21.8 (71.2)	14.0 (57.2)	3.1 (37.6)	−5.5 (22.1)	11.8 (53.2)
Daily mean °C (°F)	−14.7 (5.5)	−10.2 (13.6)	−2.1 (28.2)	6.8 (44.2)	13.5 (56.3)	18.4 (65.1)	21.8 (71.2)	20.6 (69.1)	14.2 (57.6)	6.2 (43.2)	−3.2 (26.2)	−12.2 (10.0)	4.9 (40.9)
Mean daily minimum °C (°F)	−20.8 (−5.4)	−16.7 (1.9)	−7.8 (18.0)	0.3 (32.5)	6.8 (44.2)	12.9 (55.2)	17.5 (63.5)	16.4 (61.5)	8.8 (47.8)	0.3 (32.5)	−8.3 (17.1)	−17.8 (0.0)	−0.7 (30.7)
Record low °C (°F)	−35.5 (−31.9)	−32.0 (−25.6)	−24.6 (−12.3)	−11.4 (11.5)	−3.9 (25.0)	3.4 (38.1)	7.9 (46.2)	3.1 (37.6)	−4.4 (24.1)	−12.7 (9.1)	−26.5 (−15.7)	−32.7 (−26.9)	−35.5 (−31.9)
Average precipitation mm (inches)	11.2 (0.44)	18.1 (0.71)	27.8 (1.09)	47.6 (1.87)	86.1 (3.39)	116.2 (4.57)	200.0 (7.87)	188.8 (7.43)	65.1 (2.56)	46.8 (1.84)	40.2 (1.58)	18.8 (0.74)	866.7 (34.09)
Average precipitation days (≥ 0.1 mm)	9.9	7.9	9.8	10.5	14.3	15.4	15.9	15.1	9.4	9.9	10.6	11.5	140.2
Average snowy days	12.8	11.1	11.9	5.0	0.2	0	0	0	0	3.1	11.2	15.1	70.4
Average relative humidity (%)	70	66	61	57	64	74	81	83	78	69	72	72	71
Mean monthly sunshine hours	163.5	174.5	201.3	198.5	220.0	203.0	181.7	188.1	199.0	185.4	143.5	141.5	2,200
Percentage possible sunshine	55	58	54	49	49	45	40	44	54	55	49	50	50
Source: China Meteorological Administration

== Transportation ==
- Changbaishan Airport
