= First sunrise =

Custom

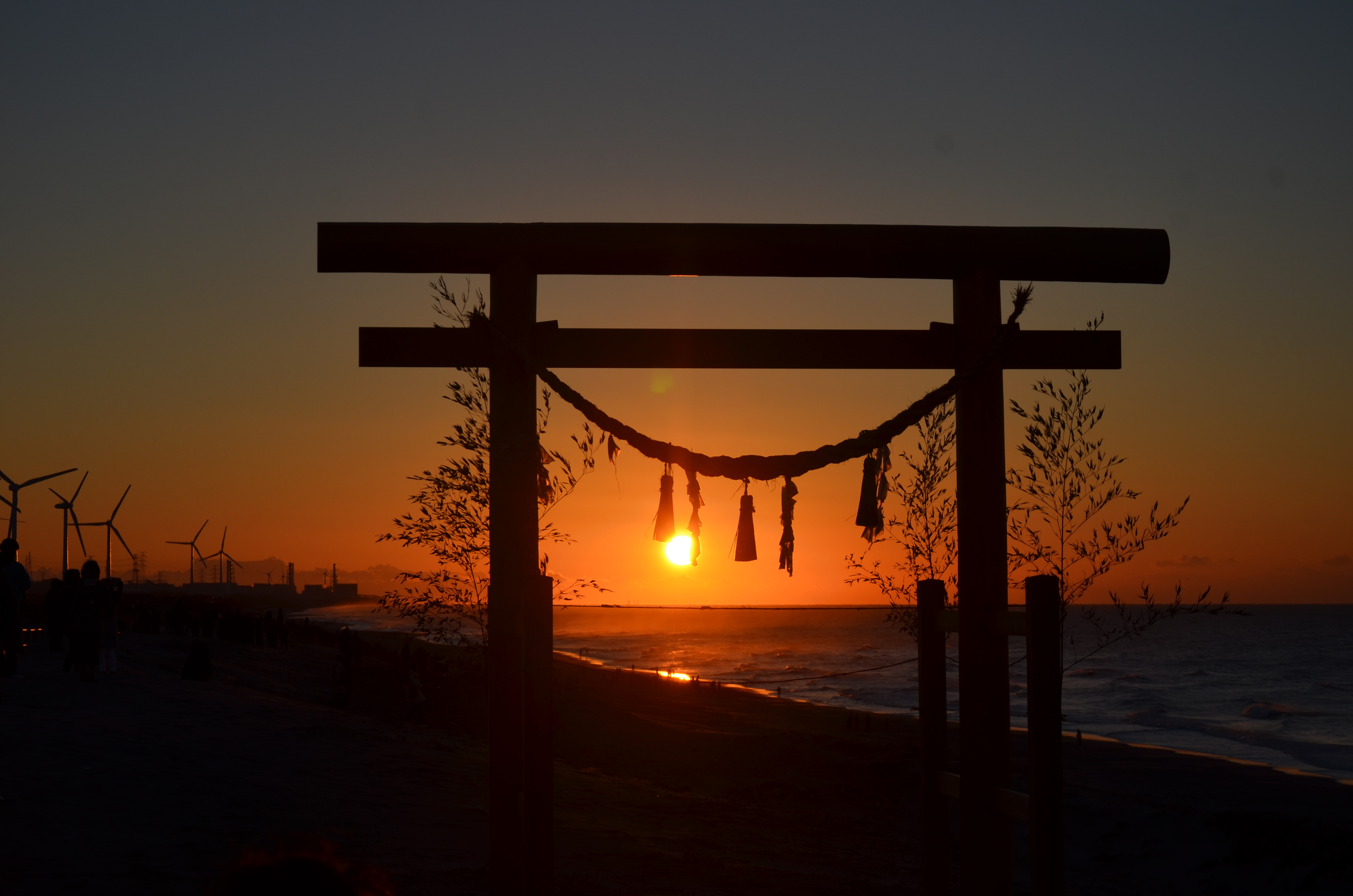
The first sunrise and torii (Kakegawa City, Shizuoka Prefecture, Japan)

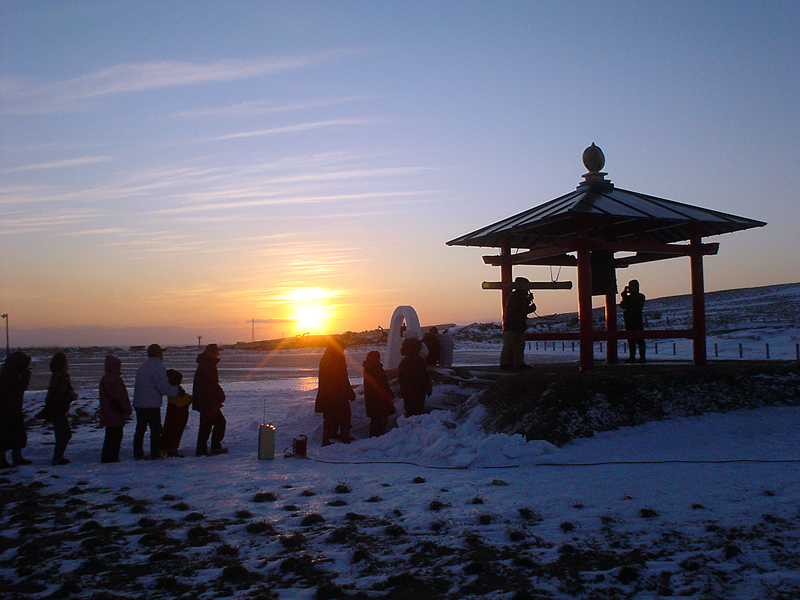
Viewing the first sunrise of the year and praying for world peace (Wakkanai City, Hokkaido, Japan)

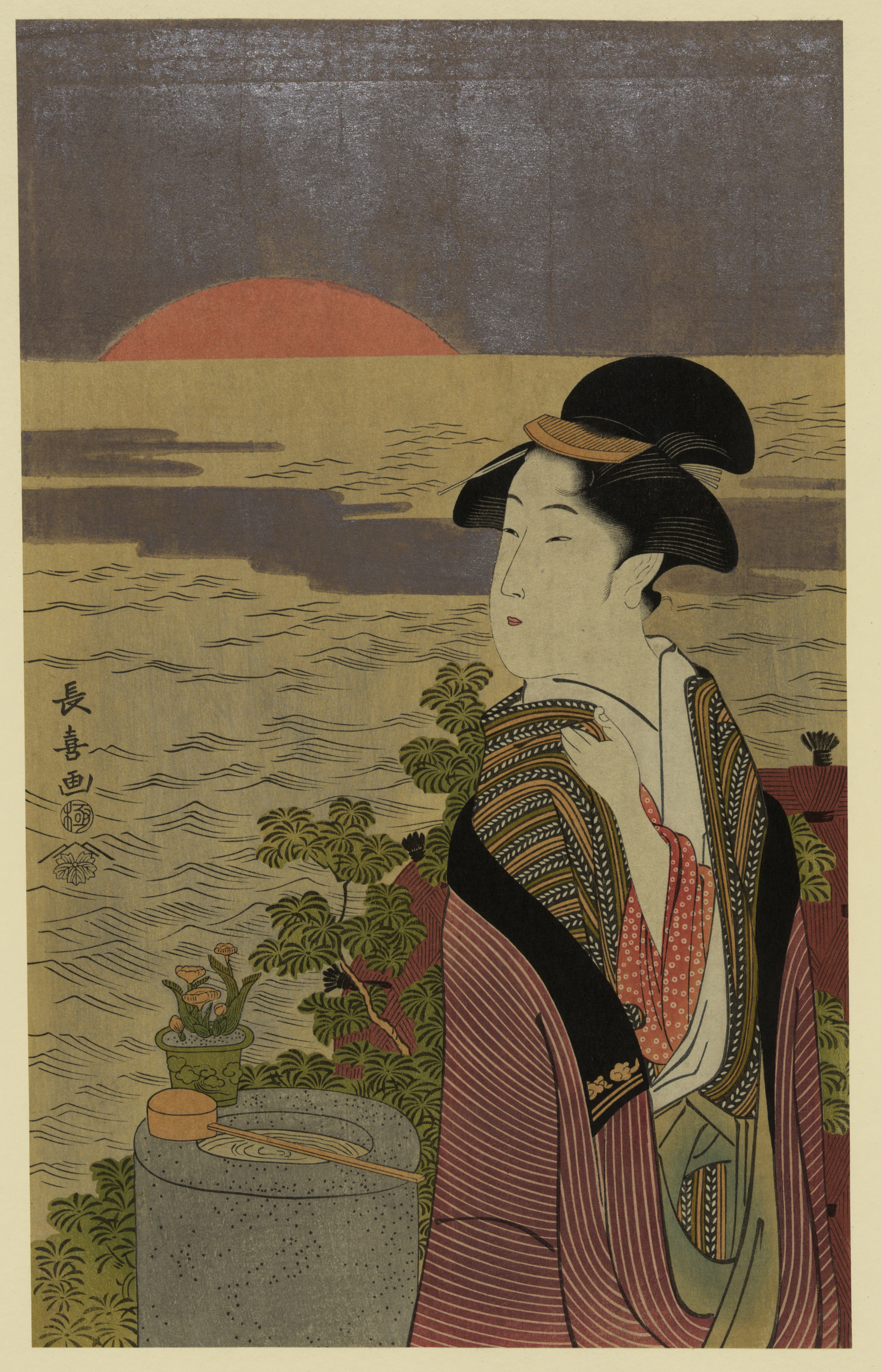
Viewing the first sunrise of the year was a popular pastime during the Edo period.

The first sunrise refers to the custom of observing the first sunrise of the year.

Such a custom may be just an observation of the sunrise on a special day (such as visiting Caroline Island in Kiribati), or has a religious meaning for those who worship the Sun, such as the followers of traditional religions in Korea, Japan, Mongolia, Australia, Polynesia and Micronesia and the Inuit, Yupik, Aleut, Chukchi, the Iñupiat, the Koryaks, the Dolgans, the Yakuts and other groups in the Arctic Circle and Siberia, for praying for good luck.

== Japan ==
In Japan, the observation of the first sunrise of the year (Japanese: 初日の出, romanized: Hatsu-Hinode) on the first day on the Old Calendar has been part of the traditional Shintoist worship of Amaterasu, the sun goddess.

Nowadays, Japanese travel agents arrange trips to observe the earliest first sunrise of the year on the new Gregorian calendar in the easternmost Ogasawara Islands of the Japanese archipelago.

== Mongolia, the Altai Republic, Buryatia, Inner Mongolia, Kalmykia and Tuva ==
In Mongolia, the Altai Republic, Buryatia, Inner Mongolia, Kalmykia and Tuva, there is a custom of observing the first sunrise on the first day of the year at the top of the mountain the Mongolian lunisolar calendar, commonly known as Tsagaan Sar. The holiday has shamanistic influences.

== Korea ==
In Korea, there is also a custom of observing the first sunrise on the first day of the year, either on the traditional Korean calendar or the new calendar. Pohang Homigot, Ulleung County and Jeongdongjin are famous place to watch first sunrise.

== Canada, Greenland, Russia and the United States ==
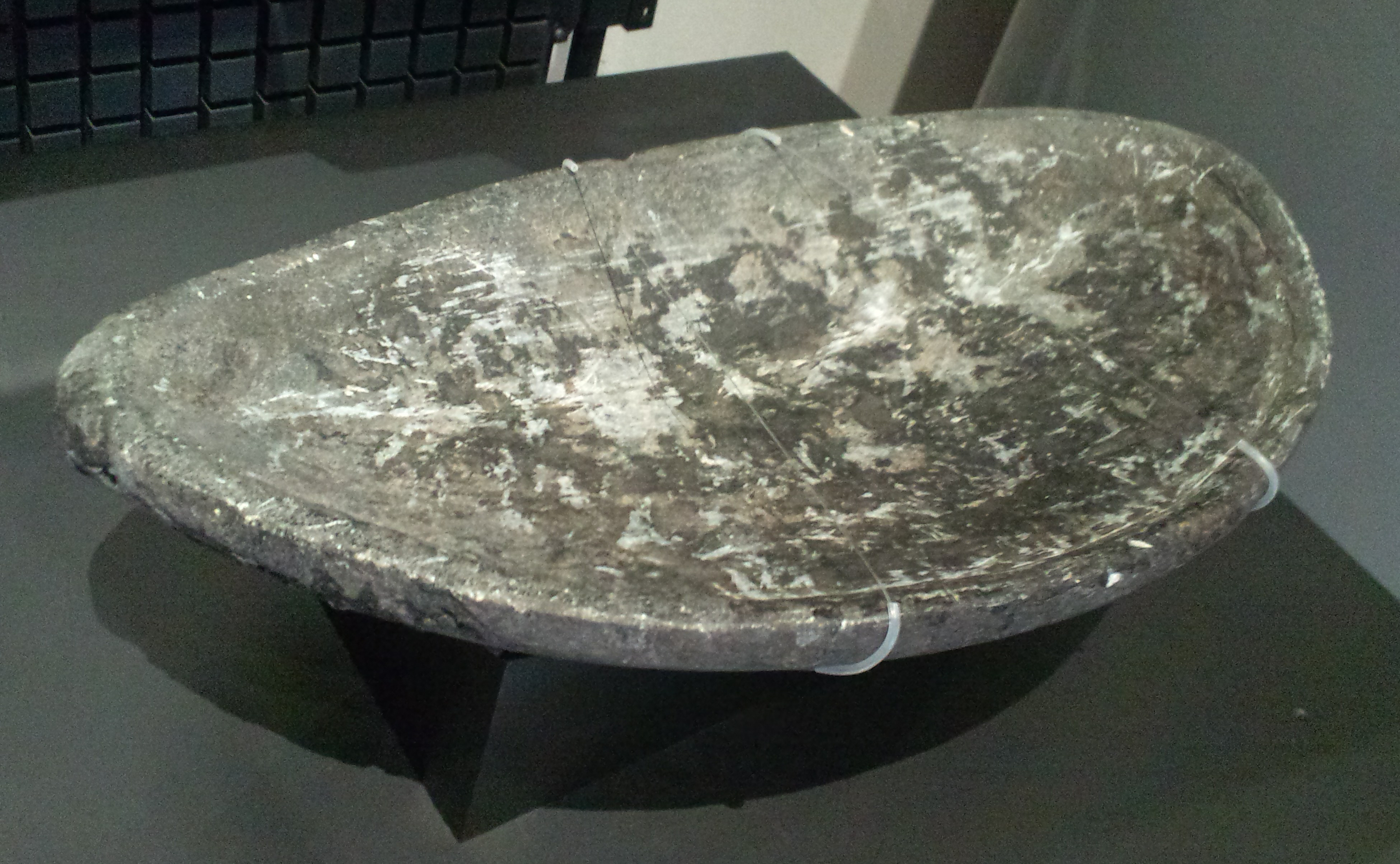
Three qulliqs were used while viewing the first sunrise.

In the Arctic circle and Siberia, the Inuit, Yupik, Aleut, Chukchi, Iñupiat, Koryaks, Evenki, Dolgans, Yakuts and other groups observe the first sunrise on the first day of the year (Inuktitut: ᓯᕗᓪᓕᖅᐹᒥ ᓯᕿᓂᖅ ᓴᖅᑭᑎᓪᓗᒍ ᐊᕐᕌᒍᒥ) by extinguishing three qulliqs (for the Inuit, Yupik, Aleut, Chukchi, Iñupiat and other groups in the Arctic) or bonfires (for Koryaks, Evenki, Dolgans, Yakuts and other groups in Siberia) and relighting them. This is to honour the sun and moon.

== See also ==
- Sunrise
- The Dreaming
- Japanese New Year
- Korean New Year
- Quviasukvik
- Caroline Island
- Pitt Island
- Young Island
- Heliacal rising
