= Yusi =

Yusi may refer to:

- Youssef Enríquez Lekhedim, a footballer also known as Yusi
- Tattler (Chinese periodical) (語絲), a Chinese literary periodical in the 1920s
- Yusi, Liaoning (于寺), a town in Fuxin Mongol Autonomous County, Liaoning, China
- Yusi, Sichuan (喻寺), a town in Lu County, Sichuan, China
- Yusi, one of the main characters in the Russian animated series Qumi-Qumi

== See also ==
- Yu Si (218–?), Eastern Wu official
