= New Year's food =

Foods traditionally eaten to celebrate the new year

New Year's foods are dishes traditionally eaten for luck in the coming year. Many traditional New Year dishes revolve around the food's resemblance to money or to its appearance symbolizing long life, such as long noodles or strands of sauerkraut. Sweets, symbolizing a sweet new year, are often given or consumed. Some cultures and religions have evolved complex food traditions associated with the new year.

== History ==
The winter solstice in the Northern Hemisphere was viewed as the demarcation point between one year and the next, and was traditionally a cause of feasting and celebration. Feasting during this period symbolized prosperity in the coming year. In Europe multiple pre-Christian festivals observed between the end of October and January such as Saturnalia, Hogmanay, Dies Natalis Solis Invicti, and Kalends of January were held to ensure the return of the Sun, and they typically required feasting, gift-giving, and partying. In early Christianity these were converted into Christian feast days such as Halloween, All Saints' Day, All Souls' Day, St, Martin's Day, St. Clement's Day, St. Catherine's Day, St. Andrew's Day, St. Nicholas's Day, St. Lucia's Day, St. Thomas the Apostle's Day, and the Twelve Days of Christmas, which started with Christmas Eve and ended with the Epiphany.

The Germanic New Year and Festival of the Yule has been celebrated from mid-November through early January from pre-Christian times. Eating and drinking are central to the celebrations. In 567 CE the Second Council of Tours designated the days from Christmas Eve to the Epiphany as a feast period, which eventually was made into law in 877 as the Twelve Days of Christmas by Alfred the Great. In the 8th century Bede referred to the extended period of feasting as Giuli.

The rituals of the extended festival surrounding January 1, including the traditional foods and hospitality required, served to build community.

== Symbolism ==
The tradition behind eating certain foods on New Year's Eve or on New Year's Day (and sometimes at the stroke of midnight) is the belief that eating these foods will ensure the coming year will be a good one and the superstition that not eating those foods will leave one vulnerable to bad luck.

Many foods and dishes are symbolic of long life, good luck, abundance, and prosperity in various cultures and traditions. Green foods symbolize cash in places where paper money is green, long foods such as noodles or stranded foods such as sauerkraut to symbolize a long life, disk-shaped to symbolize coins, and gold- or silver-colored foods to symbolize precious metals and therefore prosperity. Fish and pigs move forward, so eating them is considered to represent progress, and in general pigs are considered lucky and silver-skinned fish as symbolic of money in multiple cultures. Foods that are ring-shaped, such as bundt cakes, are considered to represent a full circle of luck. Honey is considered symbolic of a sweet year to come; multiple traditions give and consume sweets. It is common to value feasting at the New Year, whenever it is celebrated, as many cultures believe what happens on New Year's Day is a portent for the entire year, and a large meal is symbolic of a bountiful year without hunger.

Beverages also are considered symbolic. Champagne is considered symbolic of prosperity.

== By religion ==
=== Baha'i ===
No Ruz is one of nine Baha'i holy days, which takes place around the March equinox. It is the final day of a 19-day fast, and concludes with a feast of traditional foods.

=== Buddhism ===
Offerings of mochi at the New Year for good fortune in the coming year are traditional in Japanese Buddhism.

=== Byzantine Catholicism ===
The Feast of the Circumcision was traditionally celebrated on January 1.

=== Eastern Orthodox ===
The Feast of the Circumcision was traditionally celebrated on January 1.

=== Greek Orthodox ===
Vasilopita, or St. Basil's Cake (or St. Basil's Bread), are sweet cakes eaten for the Feast of St. Basil on the first of January. Eating vasilopita is believed to bring blessings and luck for the upcoming year.

=== Islam ===
Islamic New Year is the first day of Muharram. On the first nine days a sherbet is eaten "to commemorate the intense thirst which Hussein suffered" during the battle of Kerbala. The tenth day is Ashura, a day of fasting. It does not occur on the same day of the Gregorian calendar every year. The 2021 date was in August and the 2022 date is predicted to be in July.

=== Judaism ===
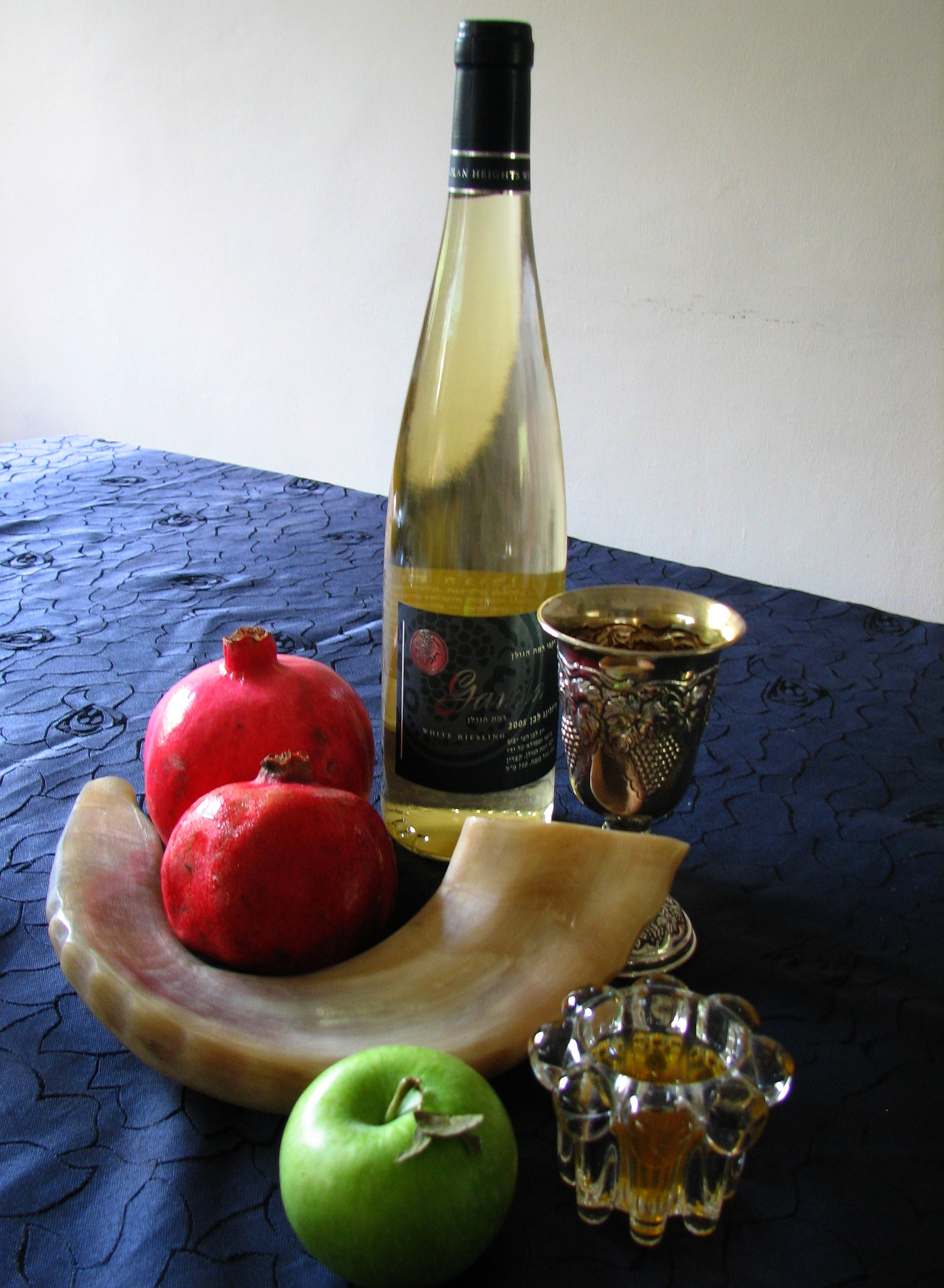
Traditional Rosh Hashanah foods: Apples dipped in honey, pomegranates, wine for kiddush

Rosh Hashanah is celebrated by practicing Jews throughout the world on the first day of Tishrei, which falls between early September and early October. Rosh Hashanah meals usually include apples dipped in honey to symbolize a sweet new year; this is a late medieval Ashkenazi addition, though it is now almost universally accepted. (Note: In modern times, it is common for Jews who are also vegan to replace the honey with agave syrup.) Other foods with a symbolic meaning may be served, depending on local minhag, such as the head of a fish (to symbolize the prayer "let us be the head and not the tail"). Many communities hold a Rosh Hashanah seder during which blessings are recited over a variety of symbolic dishes. The blessings have the incipit "Yehi ratzon", meaning "May it be Thy will." In many cases, the name of the food in Hebrew or Aramaic represents a play on words. The Yehi Ratzon platter may include apples (dipped in honey, baked or cooked as a compote called mansanada); dates; pomegranates; black-eyed peas; pumpkin-filled pastries called rodanchas; leek fritters called keftedes de prasa; beets; and a whole fish with the head intact. It is also common among Sephardim to eat stuffed vegetables called legumbres yaprakes.

Some of the symbolic foods eaten are dates, black-eyed peas, leeks, spinach, and gourd, all of which are mentioned in the Talmud: "Let a man be accustomed to eat on New Year's Day gourds (קרא), and fenugreek (רוביא), leeks (כרתי), beet [leaves] (סילקא), and dates (תמרי)."

Pomegranates are used in many traditions, to symbolize being fruitful like the pomegranate with its many seeds. Typically, round challah bread is served, to symbolize the cycle of the year. From ancient to quite modern age, lamb head or fish head were served. Nowadays, gefilte fish and lekach are commonly served by Ashkenazic Jews on this holiday. On the second night, new fruits are served to warrant the inclusion of the shehecheyanu blessing.

=== Shinto ===
Offerings of mochi at the New Year for good luck in the coming year are traditional in Shinto.

=== Sindhi Hinduism ===
Cheti Chand, the lunar Hindu New Year for Sindhi Hindus, is celebrated with feasts. It typically occurs in March or early April.

== By country ==
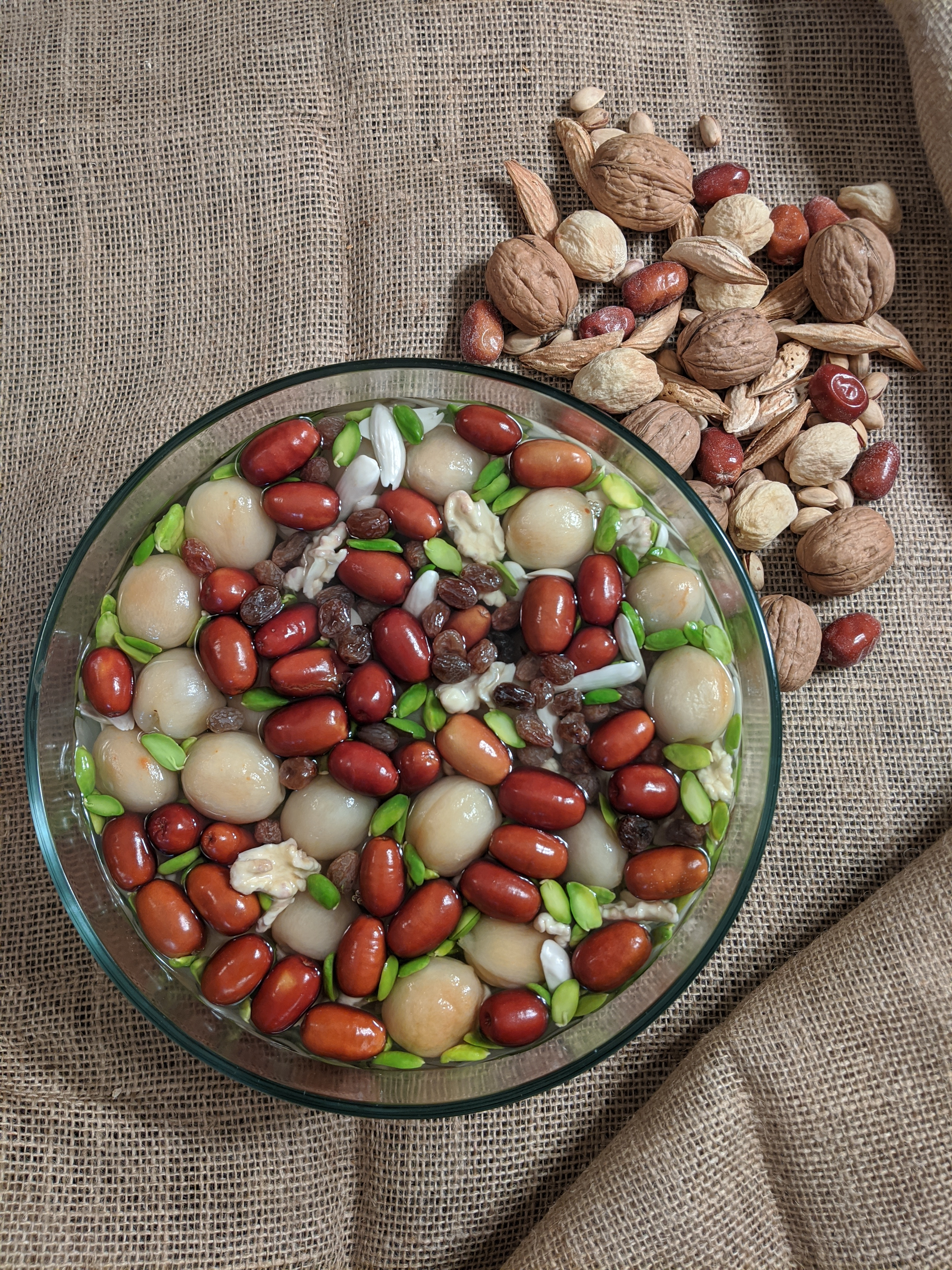
Afghani haft mewah

=== Afghanistan ===
Afghanistan celebrates two New Year's Days, one according to the lunar Islamic calendar and one according to the Persian calendar. The Persian calendar New Year, No Ruz, is a two-week period celebrated at the vernal equinox which includes playing Buzkashi, considered Afghanistan's national sport, and eating samanak and haft mewah or haft mewa, which translates to "7 fruits" and is a dish of 7 dried fruits and nuts typically including raisins and golden raisins, dried apricots, senjed, walnuts, almonds, and pistachios, although recipes vary by region and family. Haft mewah symbolizes spring, and the number 7 is considered lucky.

New Year's foods may also include sabzi chalaw, a type of spinach and lamb curry; maasteh khanagi, a type of yogurt; kolcheh nowrozi or kulchai nowrozi, a cookie; and mahee and jelabi or mahi wa jelabi, a deep-fried fish accompanied by a fried and sugar-glazed batter. The family of a prospective groom traditionally prepares certain dishes as gifts to the family of the prospective bride during No Ruz.

=== Albania ===
No Ruz is celebrated on January 1 and includes haft sin, seven items that begin with the Persian letter sin, or S, typically including the food items samanu, sabzeh, seer, senjed, and serkeh, along with sekeh, a gold coin symbolizing prosperity, and sonbol, a flower symbolizing life and beauty. Samanu, a sweet wheat pudding, represents fertility and sweetness. Sabzeh, a lentil dish, represents rebirth. Seer (garlic) symbolises medicine. Senjed symbolizes love. Serkeh, an aged vinegar, symbolizes patience and age.

=== Algeria ===
Algeria celebrates two New Year's days, the January 1st date of the Gregorian calendar and the first day of Muharram. The tenth day of Muharram is Ashura, and many Algerians will fast. Those who do not may eat couscous, which is one of Algeria's national dishes. Berber Algerians additionally celebrate the Berber New Year on January 14 or 12.

=== Armenia ===
Armenian celebrations are on January 1, when flat breads called darin are baked. The baker includes a coin in the dough, and the person finding the coin in their portion is believed to be lucky in the new year.

=== Austria ===
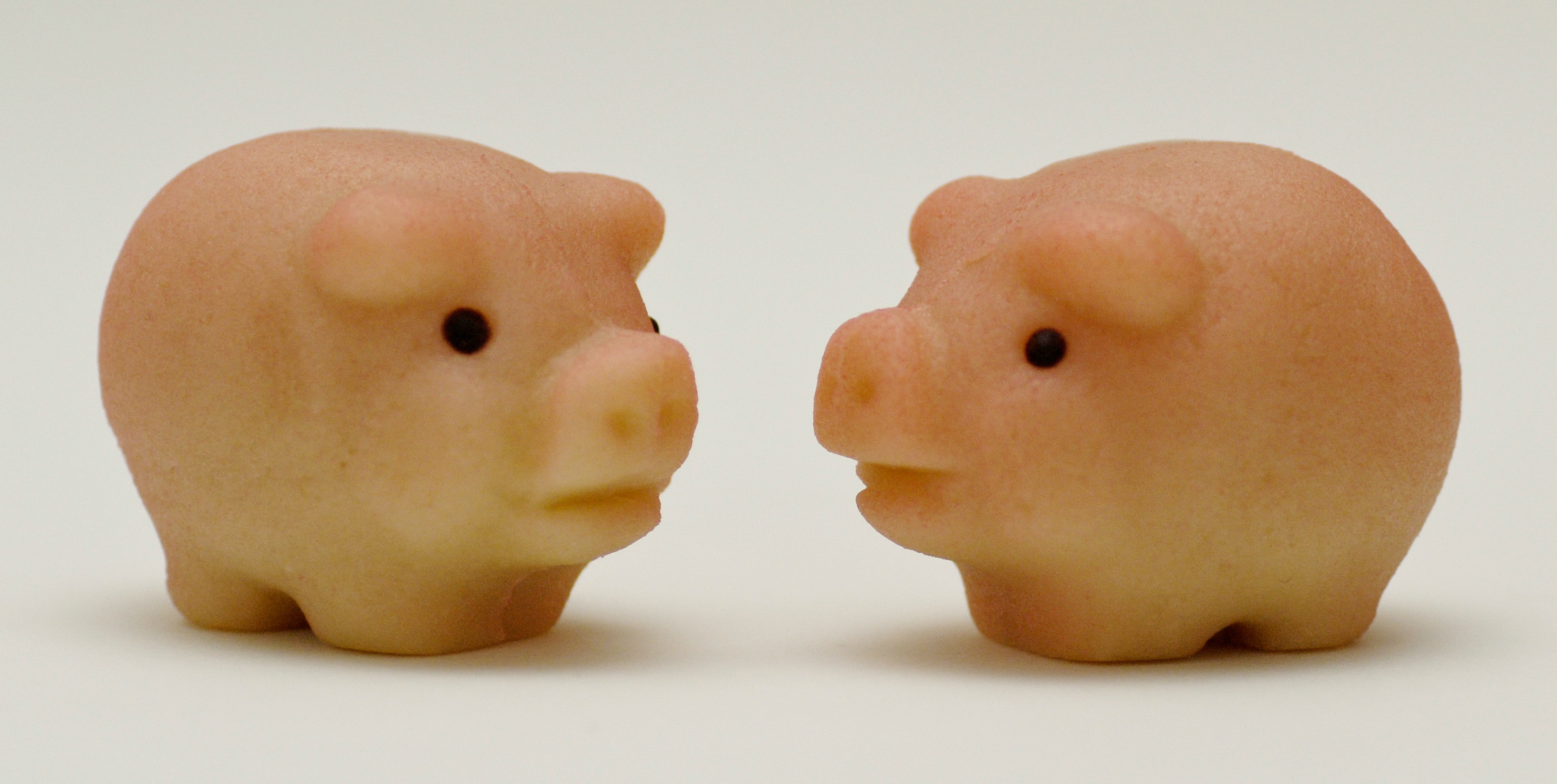
Marzipan pigs

Austria celebrates New Year's Eve as Sylvesterabend (eve of Saint Sylvester's Day) by drinking a spiced wine punch and eating suckling pig and Glücksschwein (good luck pigs). Glücksschwein can be made from various sweets; marzipanschwein are pigs made from marzipan. Feuerzangenbowle (fire tongs punch), the ingredients of which are red wine, rum, citrus, and spices, is a drink popularized by Die Feuerzangenbowle by Heinrich Spoerl and Die Feurzangenbowle by Helmutt Weiss.

=== Azerbaijan ===
Azerbaijan celebrates a secular holiday on January 1 and a religious holiday, Novruz Bayram, on March 21. Although most Azerbaijanis are Muslim, the January 1 holiday is often celebrated with a champagne toast just before and after the New Year. Germinating samani (wheat sprouts) and placing them on a woman's head is believed by some to cure infertility. The samani toyu, the ritual by which the samani is prepared, is participated in only by women. It is traditional for children to leave baskets on neighbors' doorsteps to be filled with sweets, nuts, and pastries while the children hide nearby. Trees which have not borne fruit are forgiven in a ritual called the Bailment of Trees. Samani, pakhlava and shakarbura are commonly eaten in the north and yeddi lovun, a type of haft sin, in the south.

=== Belarus ===
In what is now Belarus, people celebrated Kaliady, a pagan festival at the winter solstice that was recognized as the beginning of the new year. After the advent of Orthodox Christianity, Kaliady traditions were retained as part of Christmas and New Year's celebrations. People go from house to house dressed as wild animals and carrying a goat's head, which symbolizes fertility, and householders give them food and drink.

Roast goose or chicken, stuffed with apples, is traditionally eaten for New Year's dinner. Eating as many pieces of meat as possible during New Year's dinner is believed to ensure happiness in the coming year, and a "bountiful table" will ensure wealth.

It is traditional to place a bit of bread for each family member on a shelf on New Year's Eve, with superstition saying that any family member's bread that is missing in the morning will die in the coming year.

=== Bulgaria ===
A New Year's Eve dinner is indistinguishable from the traditional Bulgarian Christmas dinner of pork, raqiya (grape brandy and red wine), pogacha, a compote of dried fruits, and banitza. Pogacha, a round bread, is served hot from the oven by the eldest family member to the rest of the family in order of age. The pork symbolizes luck, as the pig roots forward.

The banitza, a cheese pastry, is stuffed with fortune slips, cornel buds (which symbolize health), and a coin. The platter of banitza is turned three times, then each person takes the closest pastry and reads out their fortune for the new year. Unmarried family members take the first bite of the banitza and place it beneath their pillow to dream of their future spouse. The last bit of the banitza is offered to the Virgin Mary.

Large walnuts bring health, and sneezing during the meal brings luck. An onion may be sliced into twelve pieces (representing the next twelve months), salted, left overnight, and examined in the morning; onion pieces with melted salt mean that month will be rainy, and onion pieces with salt that has not melted mean a dry month.

The tradition of Survakane is celebrated early New Year's Day by groups going house to house carrying a survaknitsa, a bent branch of a cornel tree which has been decorated with dried fruit and popcorn and which symbolizes health and wealth for the new year. The groups sing songs wishing a new year filled with food bounty for all and are given gifts of bread, fruits, and walnuts. Kukeri is a similar custom.

=== Cambodia ===
The Cambodian New Year, Chaul Chnam Thmey, is a three-day holiday celebrated starting on April 13 or 14. Traditional specialties include kralan (ក្រឡាន, Krâlan), a cake made from steamed rice mixed with beans or peas, grated coconut and coconut milk. The mixture is stuffed inside a bamboo stick and slowly roasted. People take gifts of food to the temples for monks and are given blessings in return.

=== Canada ===
In Canada at New Year's levées a cocktail called Moose Milk is traditional.

=== China ===
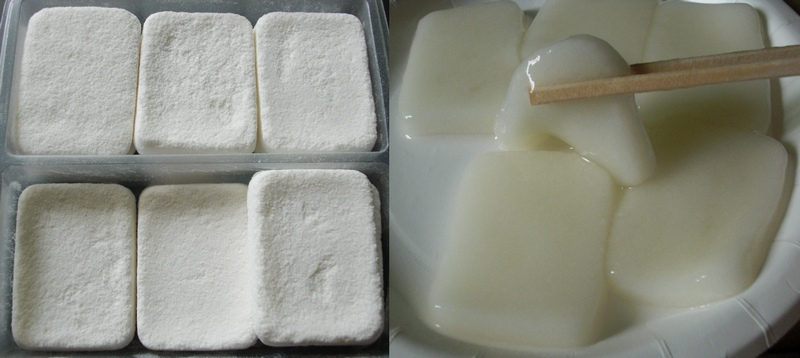
Glutinous rice cake

Chinese New Year is celebrated in January or February, depending on a lunar calendar. Gifts of citrus such as tangerines, oranges, and pomelos are thought to represent prosperity and are auspicious for New Year's Eve; their shape, color, and names are seen as symbolizing fullness and wealth. Other commonly served dishes are spring rolls, dumplings, longevity noodles, glutinous rice cake or nian gao, the name of which means progressively improving.

On New Year's Eve family members try to attend dinner together. Fat choy, an edible algae, is commonly served because the name sounds like the word for prosperity. Dumplings such as jiaozi are stuffed with a coin or a date; finding a coin symbolizes wealth in the coming year. A woman finding a date will give birth in the coming year. Fish traditionally appears on the table but is not eaten because the word for fish sounds like the word for profit or surplus, and eating it would "eat up the profit".

Between New Year's Day and the 15th day of the month people visit friends and relatives bringing gifts of citrus, and they prepare for such visits to their own homes by making chuen hop (tray of togetherness) which includes various fruits, candies, and other sweets. On the fourth day of the New Year people make offerings of wine and fruits. On the 15th day the Lantern Festival is celebrated, also called Yuan Xiao, a name for glutinous rice balls which are eaten and symbolize unity, family, and peace.

=== Croatia ===
It is considered lucky to eat heavily on New Year's Day as what happens on this day will symbolize what will happen in the new year, so eating heartily portends bounty. Drinking heavily is also portentous of bounty, but drunkenness is not. Traditionally a bread baked on Christmas Eve with a coin baked into it is served on New Year's Day, with the finder of the coin expecting good luck in the coming year.

=== Czechia ===
On New Year's Eve, Den Svateho Silvestra is celebrated with traditional dinners of roast or smoked pork and cockova polevka, a lentil soup, both of which are thought to symbolize luck and wealth in the new year, and champagne toasts are common at midnight. On New Year's Day or novy rok eating a pig's ear or jowl is considered lucky. Eating fish or fowl is considered unlucky. Cutting into an apple and finding healthy seeds brings good health.

=== Democratic Republic of Congo ===
Communal village feasts are customary starting mid-morning New Year's Day and continuing until late afternoon. Celebrations are typically segregated by gender and feature homebrewed beers.

=== France ===
Galette des rois or gateau de rois is a type of king cake often served on New Year's Eve and the Epiphany.

=== Germany ===
Like Austria, many in Germany celebrate with spiced wine, suckling pig dinners, and Glücksschwein. Pickled herring is often served.

=== Greece ===
Vasilopita is a type of bread or king cake which is eaten on New Year's Day (the feast of St. Basil) to bring luck for the upcoming year. Coins or trinkets are baked into the dough; it is considered lucky to find one. Eating pomegranates is considered symbolic of fertility and abundance. Diples are a typical dessert in the Peloponnese and are also served at weddings and at New Year's celebrations.

=== Hungary ===
Traditional celebration food on New Year's Eve is virsli, a sausage served with mustard or horseradish, and a poppyseed roll known as bejgli. Champagne is served in midnight toasts. On New Year's Day the traditional meal is pork, lentils, and cabbage soup. Eating something sweet brings luck. Eating pork brings luck, especially the tail. Eating chicken or fish is unlucky.

=== Iran ===
New Year's Day is celebrated on the first day of Muharram on the Islamic calendar and first day of Farvardin on the Persian calendar. Shi'ite Muslims celebrate the first ten days of Muharram, and the entire country celebrates the Persian New Year as No Ruz.

Shab-e Jome is a traditional dinner of chicken and rice pilaf the Thursday before No Ruz; this meal ensures a similar meal will be served weekly in the coming year. Haft sin is prepared from seven items, primarily foods, to symbolize good fortune in the new year; these typically include sabzeh (sprouted grains or legumes) for rebirth, sangak for prosperity, senjed for love, seeb for health and beauty, samanu for fertility, somaq for good triumphing over evil, seer for medicine, sohan for the "sweetness of life", and serkeh (an aged vinegar) for patience and age.

On Sal Tahvil, or New Year's Eve, families send a younger family member outside just before midnight so that the first foot to enter the house in the New Year is young and healthy; the family member often brings something sweet in with them to bring luck and health.

Sabzi Polo Mahi is the traditional meal served on New Year's Day and typically includes herbed rice and fish, reshteh polo (a rice and noodle dish similar to tahdig), dolme barg, and kookoo sabzi. After the meal Deed-o Bazdeed, or New Year's Visits, begin and continue until the 13th day of No Ruz. Typically sweets, nuts, tea, and fruit is served to visitors.

On the final day of Muharram, Sizdah Bedar, or Day 13 Outing, no food is served in homes as the holiday is celebrated by families leaving their homes to spend the day away to prevent bad luck from entering their home due to 13 being an unlucky number.

=== Ireland ===
In Gaelic New Year's Eve is called Oiche na Coda Moire, or Night of the Big Portion, as eating a large meal is symbolic of having plenty in the coming year. Multiple traditional rituals for "banishing hunger" for the coming year were known, most of which involved throwing a cake against a wall or door on New Year's Eve.

=== Italy ===
Lentils, the most common of which are greenish-brown disks, are considered to resemble the coins of ancient Rome and are symbolic of good luck and prosperity. In Italy, dishes of lentils and sausage, also sliced into disks, are typical New Year food. One common dish is Cotechino con lenticchie, believed to bring good luck. Another common dish is zampone; chiacchiere is a common dessert, and prosecco is often served. New Year's Eve is celebrated as La Festa di San Silvestro.

=== Japan ===
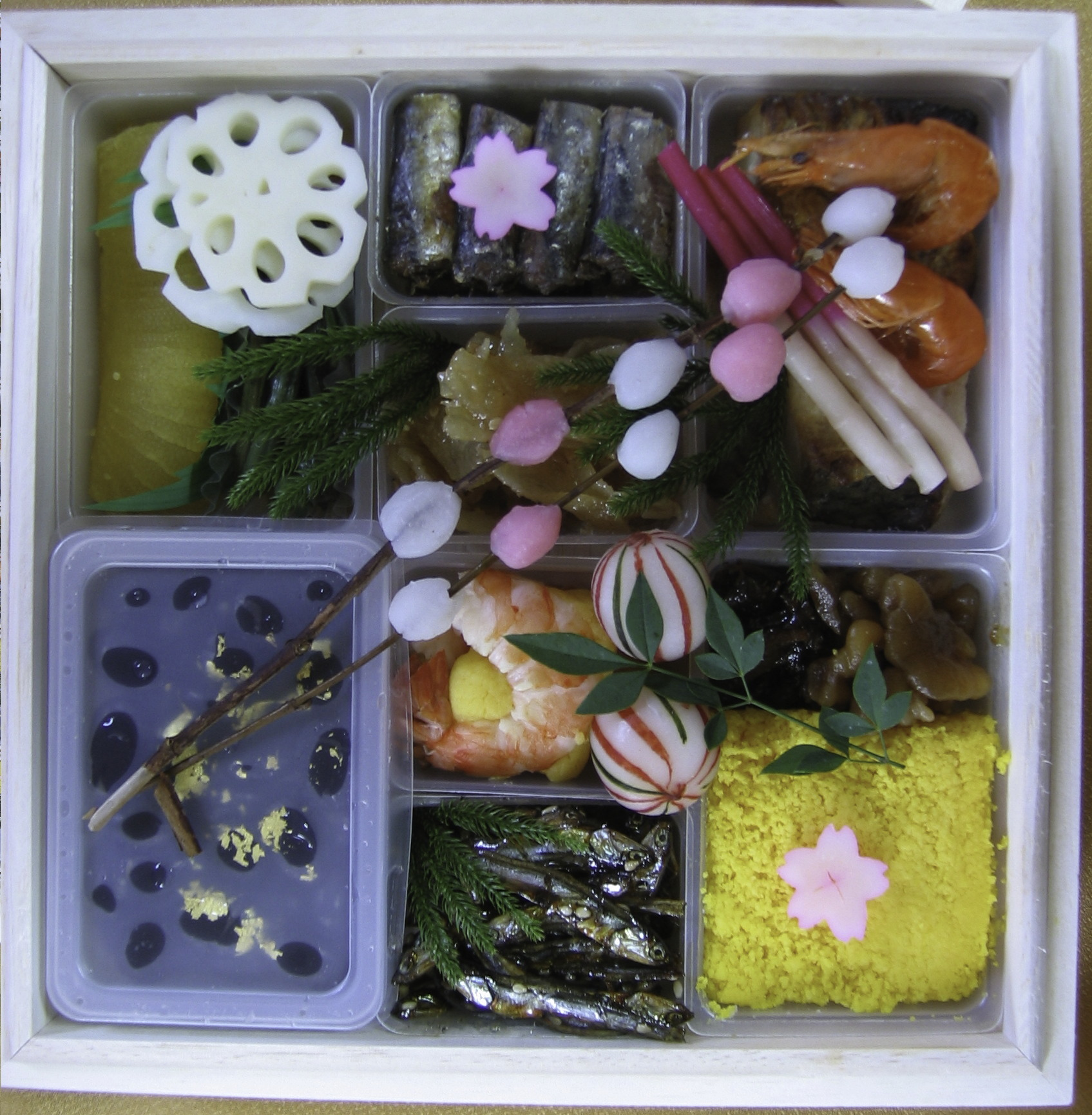
Osechi

Osechi is an entire category of foods traditionally associated with the Japanese New Year, which until the late 1800s was celebrated according to a lunisolar calendar. Eating soba noodles or toshikoshi, which means "to climb or jump from the old year to the new", at midnight on New Year's Eve is considered lucky for the new year. The tradition dates to at least the 17th century. The long strands are symbolic of longevity and prosperity. The tradition of eating noodles on New Year's Eve dates to the 13th or 14th century. Making and eating mochi rice cakes, mochitsuki, is also traditional at New Year's. Mochi is also eaten in the form of zōni. Mochi is left as an offering at Buddhist and Shintoist temples to ensure luck for the coming year.

=== Kazakhstan ===
Kazakhs celebrate No Ruz on the first day of Farvadin on the Persian calendar. It is celebrated for a single day and involves feasting, often a haft sin. Most families will serve kozheh, a dish that includes seven ingredients symbolizing life and rebirth: water, meat, salt, flour, fat, a grain such as corn, rice, or wheat, and milk. Elders are served seven bowls of kozheh. Other commonly served No Ruz dishes include sumalak, plov, shurpa, and samsa.

In some areas it is common for a woman to serve qyaqi ashar, a horse meat dish, to her boyfriend on New Year's Eve.

=== Korea ===
In Korea, soup with white broth and white food such as tteok (rice cakes, typically long garae-tteok that symbolizes longevity) or mandu (dumplings) are eaten in both Western and traditional New Year's Day, the latter known as Korean New Year. In the South of the peninsula, where traditionally rice was abundant, it is customary to eat tteokguk (rice cake soup), whereas in the cold and mountainous North where rice was scarce and mandu could be stored frozen outside in winter, mandu-guk (dumpling soup) is the traditional New Year's dish. In the central region such as Seoul, it is common to eat tteok-mandu-guk (rice cake and dumpling soup).

=== Madagascar ===
New Year's Day is celebrated January 1 as a public holiday, and the Malagasy new year, Alahamady Be, starts at the new Moon in March and lasts two days. The celebration features Madagascar's national dish, romazava served with vary, or rice. Those celebrating do not drink alcohol.

=== Mexico ===
Tamales are a traditional food in Mexico throughout the holiday season from the Feast of Our Lady of Guadalupe on 12 December to Three Kings' Day on 6 January. Rosca de reyes is a type of king cake also served during the season.

=== Mongolia ===
Ul boov and buuz are prepared for the Mongolian lunar new year, Tsagaan Sar.

=== Netherlands ===
Oliebollen, a type of deep-fried sweetened dumpling, is a traditional New Year's Eve snack sold from temporary kiosks called Oliebollenkramen.

=== Poland ===
Pickled herring is a popular New Year's Eve or New Year's Day dish in Poland, and symbolizes money because of its silver color.

=== Portugal ===
Bolo Rei cake is eaten throughout the holiday season.

=== Russia ===
In Russia it is customary to celebrate New Year's with an array of hearty dishes. Traditional attribute of the New Year's table include fish aspic and meat aspic (kholodets), as well as salads such as vinegret, Olivier, Mimosa, and herring under a fur coat.

There are many delicacies on holiday table such as salami and sandwiches featuring lox or red caviar on buttered baguette slices. The main hot dish is typically roasted pork or poultry (chicken, duck, or goose). Pickles also usual on the New Year's table and mandarins are popular fruit. Napoleon cake is a traditional New Year's dessert; however, home cooks are increasingly looking to prepare something unconventional. As for drinks, champagne is a must have for New Year, alongside vodka, brandy, and other strong alcohol.

In the late 20th and early 21st centuries, some Chinese New Year traditions were adopted. These include dishes on the New Year's table that might appeal to the animal symbol of the new year from the Eastern zodiac (dragon, snake, horse, etc.). Some dishes are placed on the New Year's table that are stylistically or otherwise associated with this animal.

=== Scotland ===
In Scotland Hogmanay has long been the main holiday of the year, as Christmas celebrations were suppressed by the Church of Scotland. The traditional New Years meal is steak pie.

=== Spain ===
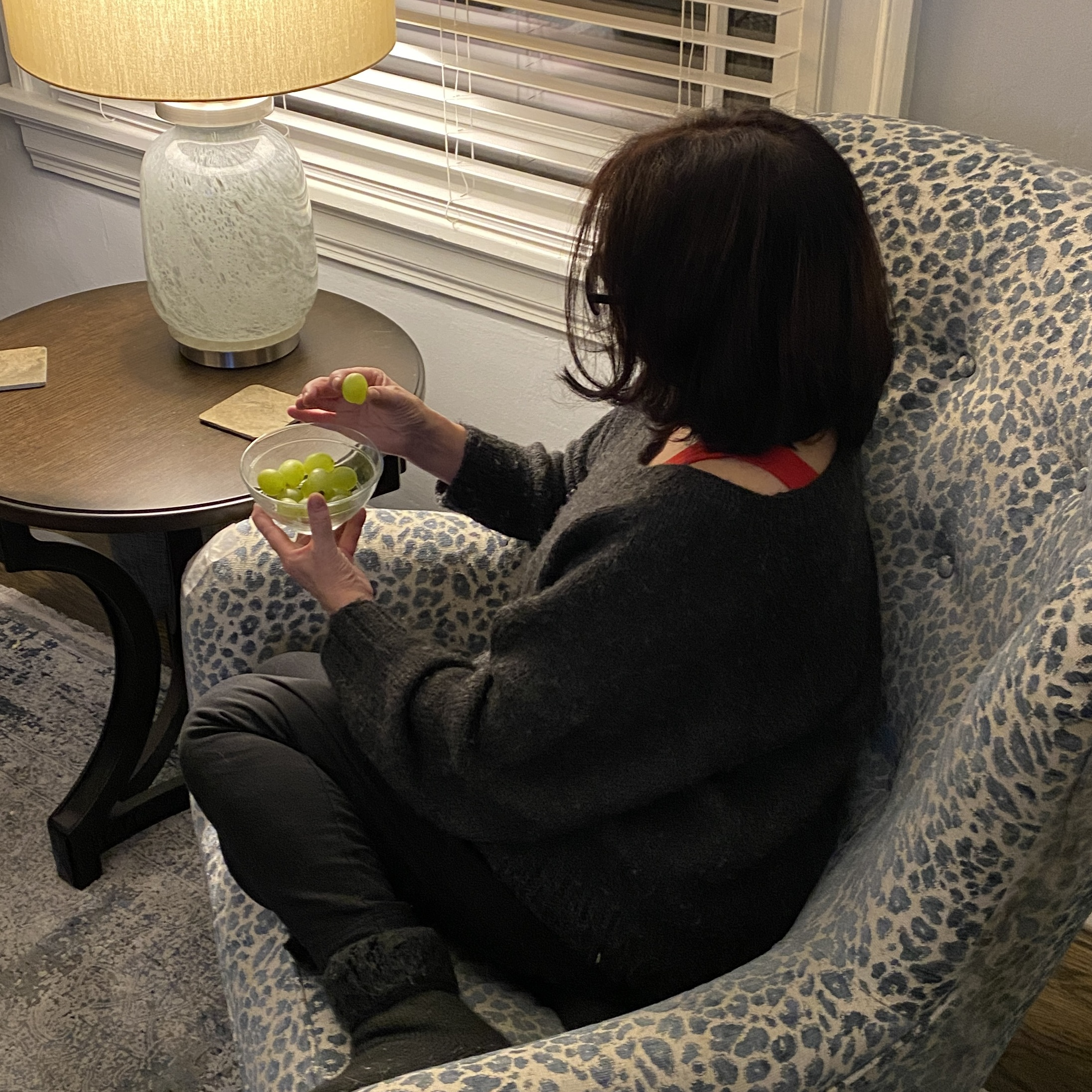
The twelve lucky grapes

It is considered good luck in Spain to eat twelve grapes at midnight, one at each tolling of the bell in the Real Casa de Correos clocktower at Puerta del Sol in Madrid, while wearing red underwear received as a gift. The tolling of the bell is televised nationally, and those watching around the country participate in the ritual. The custom is called las doce uvas de la suerte, which means "the twelve lucky grapes." Superstition says that on Nochevieja or "old night", failing to keep up with the clocktower will result in unlucky months; to ensure they can keep up with the tolling of the bell, some prepare their grapes ahead of time for faster consumption by peeling and seeding them. The custom dates to at least the 1880s and possibly the 1860s and is also observed in other Spanish-speaking countries. Physicians in local areas issue warnings against allowing children under five to participate in the custom because of choking risks; in 2017 physicians requested the chimes be spaced further apart (from three seconds to five) to help prevent choking deaths.

Typically the grapes used are a greenish-white variety called Aledo which are a traditional Spanish product that ripens in November or December and has denominación de origen status.

=== Sri Lanka ===
Sri Lankan foods served for Aluth Avurudda/Puthandu (the Sinhalese/Tamil New Years) are typically sweets or desserts. Aasmi is a traditional deep-fried sweet snack. Bibikkan is a traditional Sri Lankan coconut cake. Kalu dodol is a sweet toffee. Kevum is a deep-fried sweet.

=== United States ===
In the US, areas with large populations descended from immigrants from a particular area tend to adhere to those areas' New Year food traditions. Greens, thought to resemble dollar bills, are common New Year foods. Others include lentils, which are round disks that are considered to resemble coins, and herring, which has a silver skin considered to symbolize silver coins.

In the Midwest and certain parts of Pennsylvania, pork and sauerkraut are common New Year dishes. The fact that pigs root forward (as opposed to chickens, which scratch backward) is considered to be symbolic of making progress in the future. Long strands of sauerkraut are considered to symbolize a long life. Many in the Midwest are of German, Polish, and Eastern European descent, areas in which pork was commonly raised and where sauerkraut was common. The traditional butchering calendar also meant fresh pork was available at the time, and in most of the lower midwest cabbage is a late-year product. The tradition was likely brought to the US by the Pennsylvania Dutch.

Blackeyed peas, usually in the form of Hoppin' John, are a common New Year dish in much of the southern United States. The dish also often includes pork, considered symbolic of good luck, and often is served with collard greens and cornbread; a common New Year saying is "Peas for pennies, greens for dollars, and cornbread for gold." The tradition of eating Hoppin' John originated with enslaved people and dates to at least the 19th century; the first known mention is in the 1838 novel Recollections of a Southern Matron.

King cakes in the shape of a ring also are traditionally part of celebrations in the first days of the new year in the southern US, often with trinkets and coins baked inside. The tradition in the US dates to the late 19th century and is a successor of similar European traditions; commercial bakeries in New Orleans began producing the cakes in the 1940s.

In areas with a large number of descendants of Italian immigrants, dishes of lentils and sausages are common New Year foods. In areas with large Scandinavian-descent populations, herring is a common New Year food.

A related tradition is the smashing and sharing of peppermint pigs on Christmas Day to ensure good luck in the new year.

== By culture ==
=== Hmong ===
The Hmong celebrate Xyoo Tshiab, which translates as "the feast of thirty", as a thanksgiving and new year; it is their only formal holiday. It is celebrated after the rice harvest sometime in November and December for at least three days, with visits back and forth to family and friends at which ten dishes are served each of the three days. A common dish is sticky rice cakes baked in banana leaves and served in sugar cane syrup.
