= Fosi Reservoir =

- Interactive map of Fosi Reservoir
- Location: Fuxin County, Fuxin City, Liaoning Province
- Coordinates: 41°56′10.38″N 121°28′33.69″E
- Purpose: flood control and water storage
- Construction began: March 1976

Fosi Reservoir (simplified Chinese: 佛寺水库; traditional Chinese: 佛寺水庫; pinyin: Fósì shuǐkù) is a large reservoir in Yaowobao, Fosi Town, Fuxin Mongol Autonomous County, Fuxin City, Liaoning Province, China, located on the main stream of the Yimatu River. It is the largest flood control and water storage project in Fuxin Mongolian Autonomous County. It is a large (II) type reservoir with multifunctional functions such as flood control, water supply and breeding.

== History ==
The construction of Fosi Reservoir started in March 1976 and was completed in September 1984. The reservoir has a total storage capacity of 150 million cubic meters and is an important water source for Fuxin.
