= White Month =

White Month may refer to:

- A period of time during which a person abstains from the consumption of alcohol
- Tsagaan Sar (also spelled Tsagan Sar or Saagan Sar)- Mongolian new year's festival (literally "White Month")
