= Ul boov =

Traditional Mongolian biscuit

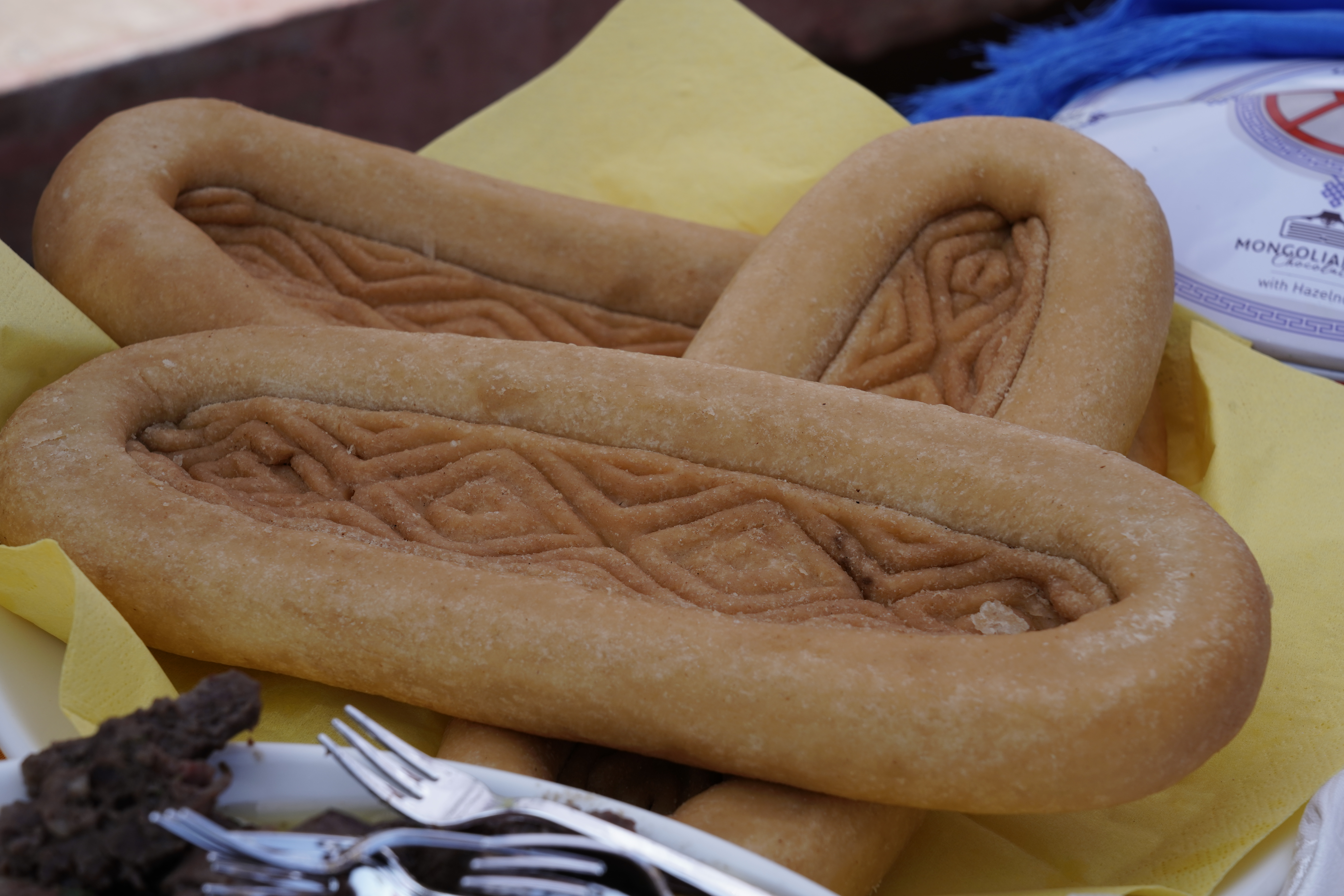
- Ul boov
- Alternative names: Kheviin boov
- Type: Biscuit
- Course: Dessert
- Place of origin: Mongolia
- Main ingredients: Sheep fat, flour, salt water, sugar, butter

Ul boov (Mongolian: ул боов) is a traditional Mongolian biscuit assembled in layers and often served as a New Year food. The number of layers in the cake represents the status of the family. The individual biscuits are stamped with a wooden block that imprints a design unique to the family, passed down through generations. It is traditionally served with aaruul in between the layers or on top.

== Terminology ==
Ul boov means "shoe soles" in English, not to be confused with the French pastry palmier, which is also known as "shoe soles" in the cuisine of the Southern United States.

== History ==
Ul boov is prepared by Mongolians for the Mongolian lunar new year, Tsagaan Sar. Tsagaan Sar is a lavish feast, requiring preparation days in advance, as the men and women make large quantities of buuz as a whole family, along with ul boov, a pastry reserved for both dessert and presentation. During Mongolia's Communist period, the government banned Tsagaan Sar after Choibalsan's death in 1952 and tried to replace it with a holiday called "Collective Herder's Day", but the holiday was practiced again after the 1990 Democratic Revolution in Mongolia.

== See also ==
- List of cakes
- Mongolian cuisine
- Tsagaan Sar
