= Quviasukvik =

Inuit New Year

Quviasukvik ᖁᕕᐊᓲᑎᖃᕐᕕᒃ
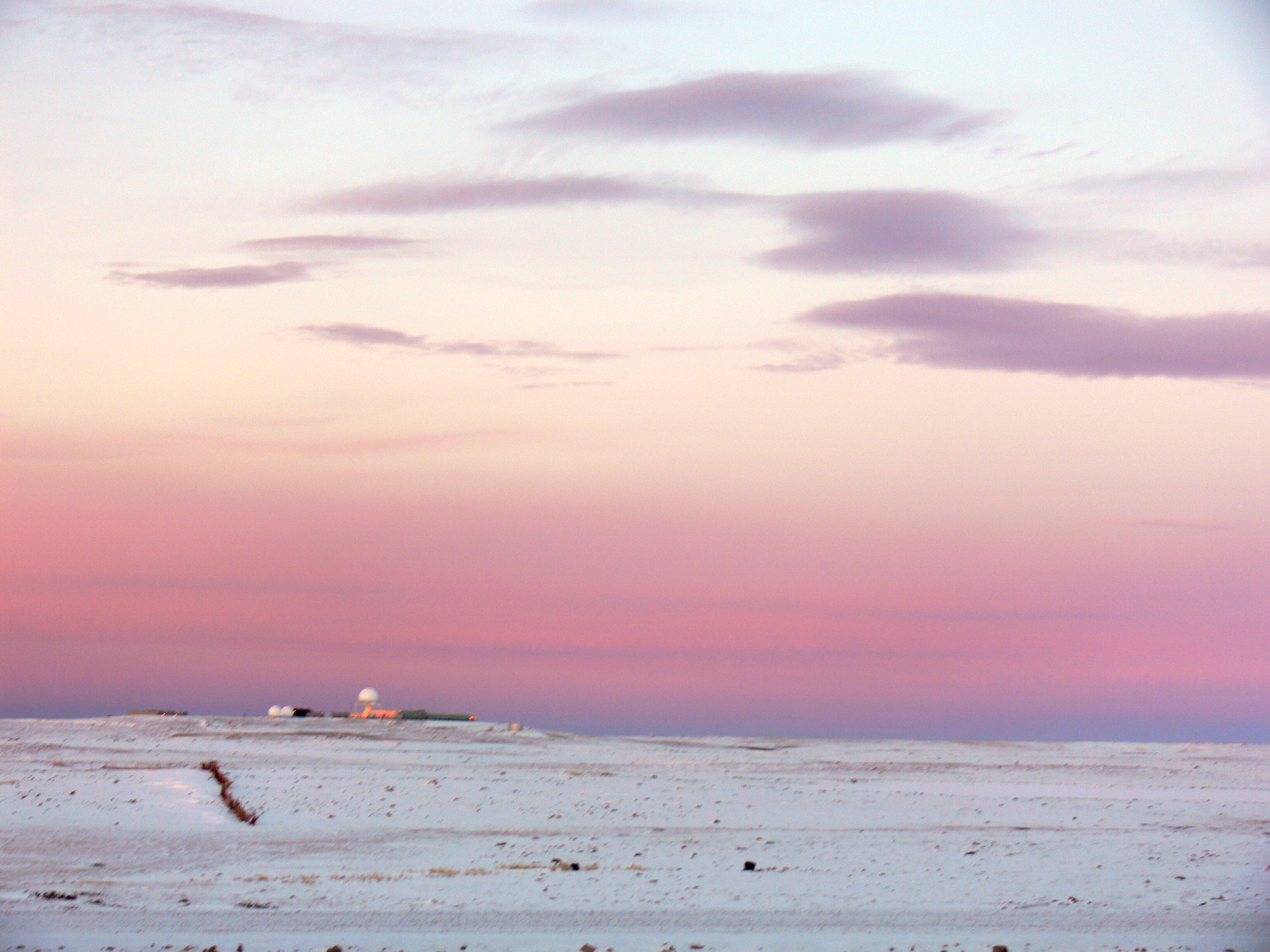
- Some Inuit, Yupik, Aleut, Chukchi and Iñupiat believed that the sunrise on December 24^{a} marked the beginning of the new year
- Also called: Quviasugvik, Inuit New Year, Happy Day, Time of Joy
- Observed by: Inuit, Yupik, Aleut, Chukchi, Iñupiat, NunatuKavummiut
- Type: Cultural (Inuit); Religious (Inuit religion, Shamanist and Christian)
- Significance: Start of the year and the roaming of the spirits for good luck
- Celebrations: Watching the first sunrise of the Inuit new year (December 24 only^{a}), parades (December 25 only), mass attendance, concerts, carnivals, fairs, Inuit traditional activities, family gathering, family meal, visiting friends and relatives, gift giving, gift shopping, goodwill greetings, late night partying, reflection, watching fireworks (December 31 only), qulliq ceremonies during the first sunrise of the Christian new year (January 1 only), Nalujuk Night (January 6), ringing of the first school bell after winter break (January 3 in Greenland; January 4, 5 or 6 only in Canada and Alaska; January 7 in Russia), flag raising ceremonies (January 7 only), qulliq ceremonies and sun-sighting during the natural first natural sunrise (varies depending on location)
- Date: December 24 to the day of the first natural sunrise
- Duration: Varies (depending on location of the first natural sunrise)
- Frequency: Annual
- Related to: Christmas, Chinese New Year, Japanese New Year, Tibetan New Year, Korean New Year, Vietnamese New Year, Mongolian New Year, Sámi New Year, Yakut New Year

Quviasukvik (Inuktitut: ᖁᕕᐊᓲᑎᖃᕐᕕᒃ; "Christmas") is the first day of the year according to Inuit. The festival of the New Year is celebrated by Inuit, Yupik, Aleuts, Chukchi, NunatuKavummiut and the Iñupiat. The feast originally derives from traditional Inuit religion but in modern times, it has Christian influences.

== Timing ==
The Quviasukvik festival starts on Christmas Eve and ends on the day of the first natural sunrise (depending on the location). This festival celebrates the coming of the new year and the sea goddess, Sedna and the transferring of spirits for good luck in the new year. During these days, many traditional customs are displayed. Due to Christian influences, Christmas was considered a new year to the Inuit which gave the festival its name.

== See also ==
- Angakkuq
- First sunrise

== Notes ==
- ^aThis would only apply in those areas where the sun rose on December 24. Many circumpolar peoples live above the Arctic Circle, experience polar night, and thus have no sunrise on December 24. For example the Copper Inuit who lived in the Umingmaktok area (67°41′45″N 107°56′45″W) did not see the sunrise between (approximately) December 12 and 29. Due to this reason, the day of the first natural sunrise marks the end of Quviasukvik.
