= Daba, Liaoning =

Daba 大巴镇 ᠳᠠᠪᠠᠭᠠ ᠬᠣᠲᠠ
- Town
- Location in Liaoning
- Coordinates: 42°5′57″N 122°0′13″E
- Country: People's Republic of China
- Province: Liaoning
- Prefecture-level city: Fuxin
- Autonomous county: Fuxin Mongol Autonomous County
- Time zone: UTC+8 (China Standard)

Daba (Chinese: 大巴; pinyin: Dàbā) Dabaga (Mongolian: ᠳᠠᠪᠠᠭᠠ; Дабага) is a town under the administration of Fuxin Mongol Autonomous County, Liaoning, China. As of 2020, it has 12 villages under its administration:

- Dudaiyingzi Village (杜代营子村)
- Ermendeli Village (二门得力村)
- Daobudai Village (道不代村)
- Banjieta Village (半截塔村)
- Chexin Village (车新村)
- Nuoriyingzi Village (诺日营子村)
- Dongweizigou Village (东苇子沟村)
- Xiaodong Village (小洞村)
- Yuanbaowa Village (元宝洼村)
- Houchaoyang Village (后朝阳村)
- Dongchaoyang Village (东朝阳村)
- Zhuligachi Village (助力嘎尺村)
