= Yhyakh =

Sakha Republic New Year Celebration

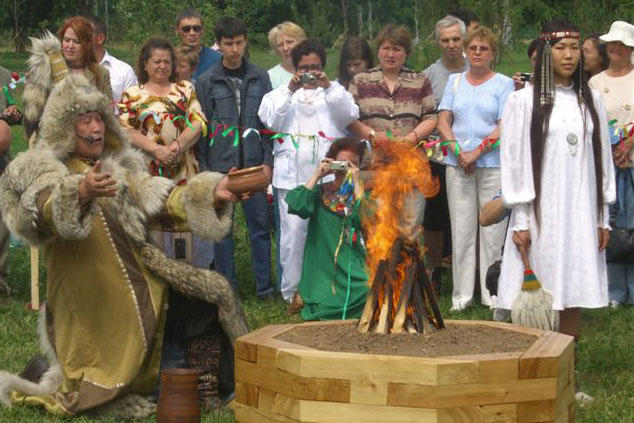
- Feeding the fire at Yhyakh Festival.
- Observed by: Yakuts and Dolgans
- Significance: The beginning of a new year
- Observances: Festivals, Ohuokhai dance, family and other social gatherings, symbolic decorating
- Date: 21 June
- Related to: Sabantuy, Tsagaan Sar, Quviasukvik

Yhyаkh (Yakut: Ыһыах, romanized: Ihıax, IPA [ɯhɯaχ]) is the festival that celebrates the rebirth of nature after a hard winter, the triumph of life, the beginning of a new year in the Sakha Republic. Historic celebration is observed on the 21st June, the day of the summer solstice.

== Celebration ==
Sakha people celebrate the New Year twice a year – in winter with the rest of citizens of Russia, and in summer – according to the ancient traditions. Yakutia is the largest region of Russia. The winter temperatures sometimes reach −60 °C, while the summer is very short, lasting only three months. The holiday is celebrated in the period between 10 and 25 June.

The Yhyakh festival (literally meaning "abundance") is related to a cult of a solar deity, with a fertility cult. Ancient Sakha celebrated the New Year at the Yhyаkh festival. Its traditions include women and children decorating trees and tethering posts with "salama" (nine bunches of horse hair hung on horse-hair ropes). The oldest man, wearing white, opens the holiday. He starts the ritual by sprinkling kymys on the ground, feeding the fire. He prays to the Ai-ii spirits for the well-being of the people who depend on them and asks the spirits to bless all the people gathered.

Afterwards, people sing and dance Ohuakhai, play national games, eat national dishes, and drink kymys.

During years of stagnation, the traditional ceremony was almost forgotten. Nevertheless, the 21st century saw a revival of Sakha culture, including Yhyakh. Until 1990, when the first Yhyakh was held in Yakutsk, traditionally accurate celebrations were only held in a few regions of the republic.

== Ohuokhai Dance ==
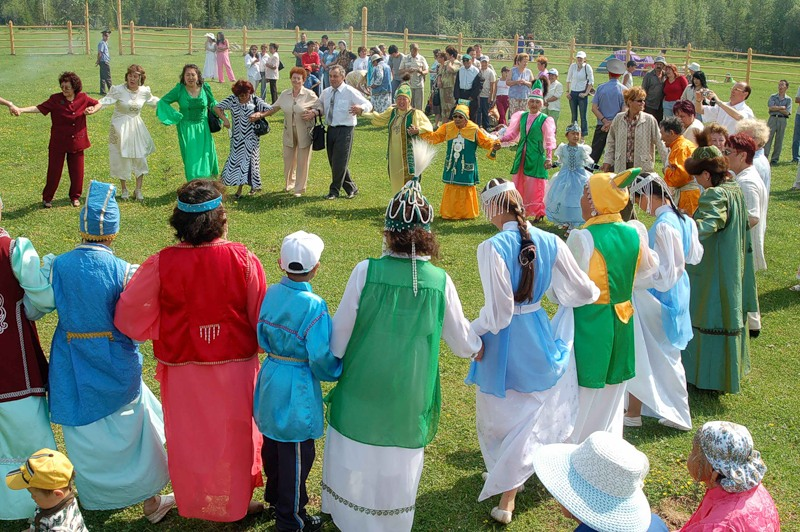
The Ohuokhai Dance

The Ohuokhai (Оhуохай) dance has its roots in the period when the Sakha people lived further south and were cattle-breeders, termed "sun worshippers". It is a native dance that combines three forms of art: dancing, singing and poetry. The Sakha word for "dance", Üñküü (Yҥкүү) comes from the verb üñ (Үҥ, "to worship").

The Ohuokhai is a simultaneous circle dance and song. Dancers form a circle and dance, arm in arm, hand in hand, with the left foot put forward, while making rhythmical, graceful movements with their bodies, legs, feet and arms. A lead singer improvises the lyrics and the other dancers repeat them. This Ohuokhai leader has a special talent not only for singing but also, what is more important, for poetic improvisation. There song leaders compete at the national Yhyakh festival for the best poetic expression, best song and biggest circle.

Poetic improvisation of the Ohuokhai represents one of the richest and oldest genres of Sakha folklore.

The melody of the Ohuokhai is put to many types of music, from marching tunes to operas. Kylyhakh is the special singing technique of vocal cord vibration. This technique gives a unique national Sakha colouring highly appreciated by experts in "throat singing". The Ohuokhai plays an important role in the development of the musical and choreographic arts.

A famous folk singer, poet and composer, Sergey Zverev from the Suntarsky region added many new elements in the expressiveness of the movements.

== Celebrations by the Sakha Diaspora ==
On June 23, 2024, the Sakha American Cultural Association in Washington State organized and celebrated Yhyakh in Lynnwood, WA.

== See also ==
- Sun Dance, a sacred ceremony of the Plains Indians carried out around Midsummer

== Bibliography ==
- Дидактический материал "Национально-региональный компонент на уроках английского языка" – Шамaева М.И., Семенова В.Д., Ситникова Н.В., Якутск 1995. (Didactic material "the National-regional component at lessons of English language" – Shamaeva M. I, Semenova V. D, Sitnikova N.V., Yakutsk 1995.)
