= Zolgokh =

Mongolian formal greeting

Zolgokh (Mongolian: Золгох) is a traditional Mongolian formal greeting. Two people hold both their arms out, and the younger person's arms are placed under the elder person's and grasps their elbows to show support for their elder. The two people then touch each other's cheeks, usually accompanied with the phrase Amar mend üü (Mongolian: Амар мэнд үү), meaning "Are you well and peaceful?".

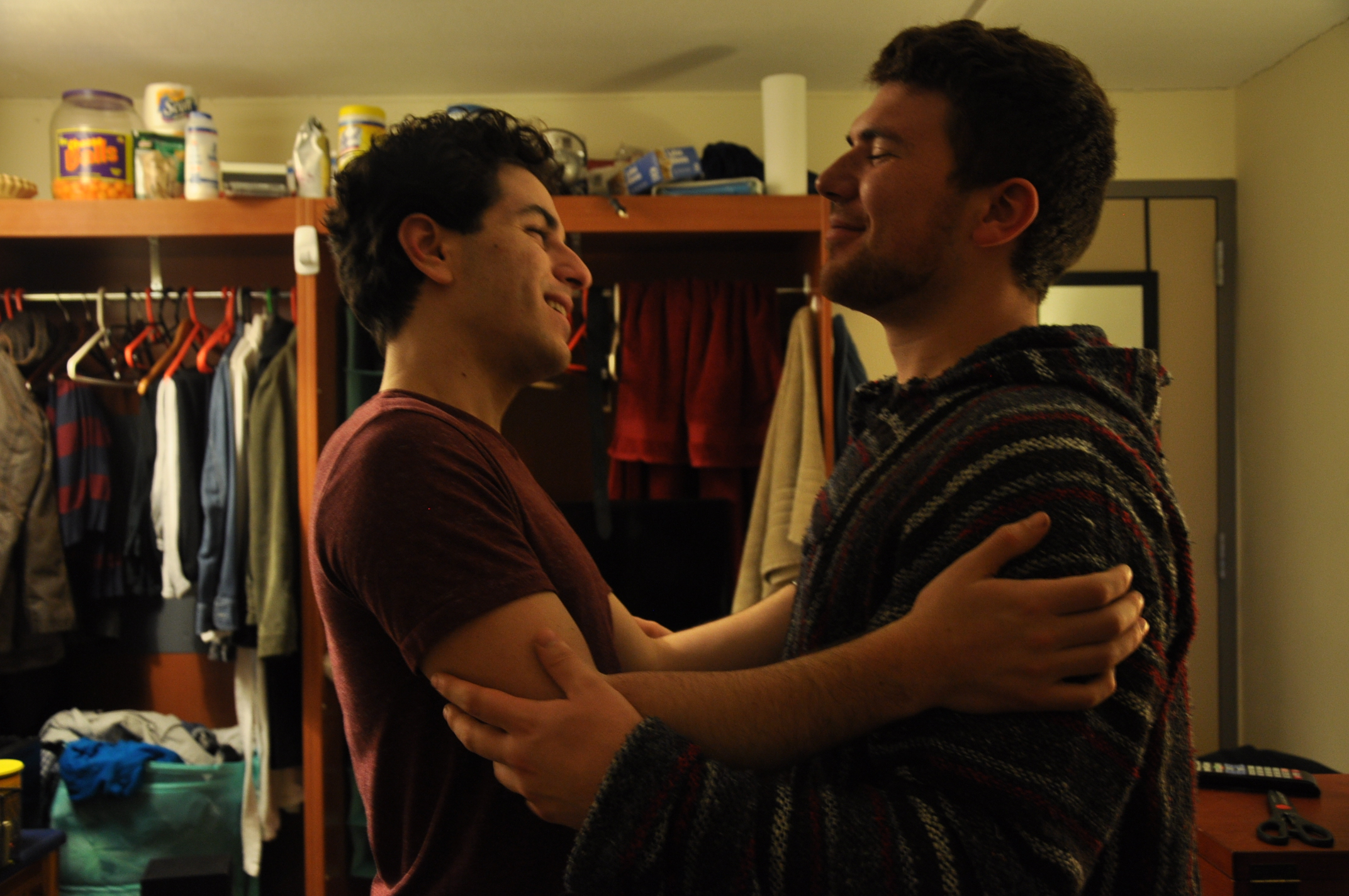
The first of two images depicting the traditional Mongolian greeting, the Zolgokh.

== Tsagaan Tar ==
In Modern contexts, the greeting is usually reserved for Tsagaan sar celebrations, where people greet each other with zolgokh, while sometimes holding a khadag and suutei tsai.

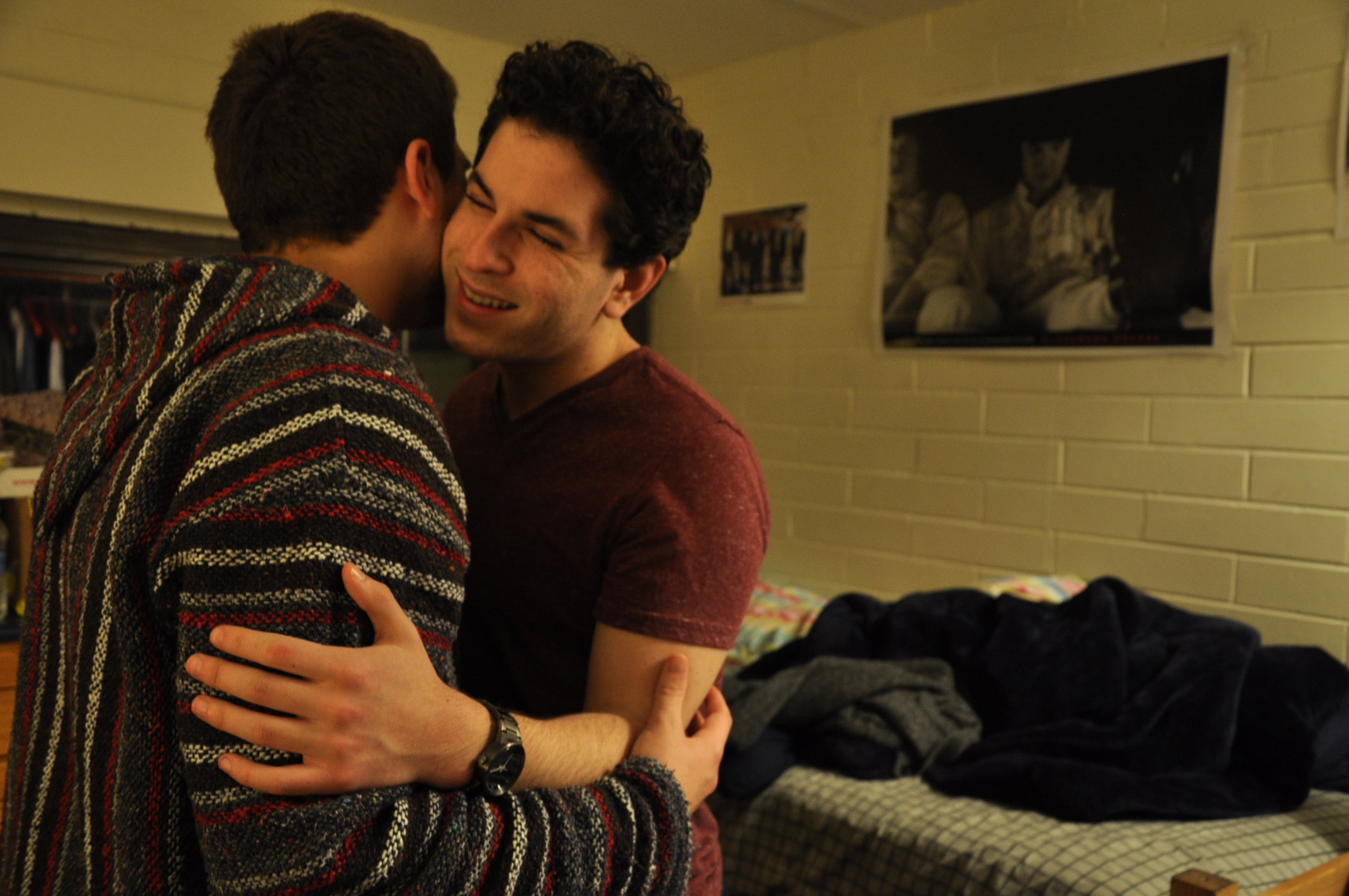
The second of two images depicting the formal Mongolian greeting, the Zolgokh.

Zolgokh is usually first performed among family members on the morning of the festival (the husband and wife do not perform the greeting with each other). The greeting is first performed with the eldest people in the family, sometimes accompanied with a gift of money and/or khadag.

== Name ==
The greeting would more accurately be termed Zolgolt, but the word "Zolgokh" has become more widespread in English. The verb form in Mongolian is "Zolgo", and the "-kh" is added to mean "to zolgo". The noun form of the greeting in Mongolian is thus Zolgolt, the suffix "-lt" being added to form a noun.
