= Qijiazi Township =

Township in Liaoning, China

Coordinates: 42.03498°N 121.34204°E

Qijiazi Town 七家子镇
- Town
- Interactive map of Qijiazi Town
- Country: China
- Province: Liaoning
- Prefecture-level city: Fuxin
- Autonomous county: Fuxin County
- Subdivisions: 9: 9 administrative villages

Qijiazi Township (Chinese: 七家子) is a township in Fuxin Mongol Autonomous County, Fuxin, Liaoning, China. It is divided into 9 villages: Qijiazi Village, Jiubeiyingzi Village, Tangtou Village, Qinghe Village, Maolinggou Village, Shichang Village, Baozhuyingzi Village, Haisitai Village, and Shuiquan Village. The township government is located in Qijiazi Village. The total area is 177.3 square kilometers and has 4210 households and 15320 people. The township has 6.4 mu of arable land, 70% of which is sloping land.
