= Public holidays in Mongolia =

The following are the public holidays in Mongolia and other special days.

== Public Holidays ==
| Date | 2026 Date | English name | Local name | Remarks |
|---|---|---|---|---|
| 1 January | | New Year's Day | Шинэ жил (Shine jil) | |
| First three days of the first spring month of the lunar year | 18–20 February | Tsagaan Sar (Mongolian Lunar New Year) | Цагаан сар (Tsagaan sar) | Tsagaan Sar is celebrated according to the lunar calendar. The date falls anywhere between the end of January and early March in the Lunar calendar. |
| 8 March | | International Women's Day | Олон улсын эмэгтэйчүүдийн өдөр (Olon ulsyn emegteichüüdiin ödör) | |
| 15th day of the first summer month of the lunar year | 31 May | Buddha's Birthday | Бурхан багшийн Их дүйчин өдөр (Burkhan bagshiin ikh düichin ödör) | |
| 1 June | | Children's Day | Хүүхдийн баяр (Khüükhdiin bayar) | |
| 10–15 July | | Naadam | Үндэсний их баяр наадам, Ардын хувьсгалын ойн баяр (Ündesnii ikh bayar naadam, Ardyn khuvisgalyn oin bayar) | Six day holiday to coincide with the Naadam Festival |
| First day of the first winter month of the lunar year | 10 November | Chinggis Khaan's Birthday | Их эзэн Чингис хааны өдөр (Ikh ezen Chingis Khaany ödör) | Established in 2012. This day expresses a symbolic Birthday of Genghis Khan as his exact date of birth is not found. |
| 26 November | | Republic Day | Бүгд Найрамдах Улс тунхагласан өдөр (Bügd nairamdakh uls tunkhaglasan ödör) | Observed since 1924 with the establishment of the Mongolian People's Republic. |
| 29 December | | Independence Day | Үндэсний эрх чөлөө, тусгаар тогтнолоо сэргээсний баярын өдөр (Ündesnii erkh chölöö, tusgaar togtnoloo sergeesnii bayaryn ödör) | |

1. Based on the non-Gregorian Mongolian calendar (Bilgiin toolol)

== Other special days and celebrations ==
- Constitution Day (13 January)
- Patriots' Day (1 March)
- Mongolian military day (18 March)
- Health Day (7 April)
- Intellectual Property Day (26 April)
- Family Day (15 May)
- National literary culture and book days (Saturday and Sunday of third week of May and September)
- State Flag Day (10 July)
- Youth Day (25 August)
- Repression Victims' Day (10 September)
- Environment Safety Day (fourth week of September)
- Elders' Day (1 October)
- Capital City Day (29 October)
- Human Rights Day (10 December)
