= Mongolian calendar =

Traditional calendar of the Mongols

The Mongolian calendar may refer to a number of different lunisolar calendars related to the Chinese and Tibetan calendars. These calendars (Mongolian: цаглабар, romanized: tsaglabar or цаг тооны бичиг, tsag toony bichig) have largely been replaced in day-to-day use with the Gregorian calendar (Аргын тоолол, Argyn toolol, 'chronology of method'), however the traditional calendar (Билгийн тоолол, Bilgiin toolol, 'chronology of wisdom') is still used for a variety of traditions such as the date of festivals like Tsagaan Sar (the Mongolian new year), horoscopy, and zodiac signs.

The traditional calendar as used in Mongolia today is a lunisolar calendar based on Tegus Buyantu zurkhai system developed in 1747 by monk Ishbaljir (Сүмбэ хамбо Ишбалжир, Sümbe khambo Ishbaljir; 1704–1788). The year is composed of either 12 or 13 lunar months, each beginning and ending with a new moon. A thirteenth month is added every two or three years, so that an average year is equal to the solar year.

The Mongol traditional new year celebration is Tsagaan Sar which is celebrated at the second new moon following the winter solstice.

== Argyn toolol ==
=== Months ===
The twelve months of the year are referred to by their number, such as first month, second month, and so on.

English name	Mongolian name	
English name	Cyrillic	Traditional
January	Нэгдүгээр сар	ᠨᠢᠭᠡᠳᠦᠭᠡᠷ ᠰᠠᠷ᠎ᠠ
January	Negdügeer sar	Nigedüger sar-a
January	Анхдугаар сар	ᠠᠩᠬᠠᠳᠤᠭᠠᠷ ᠰᠠᠷ᠎ᠠ
January	Ankhdugaar sar	Aŋqaduɣar sar-a
February	Хоёрдугаар сар	ᠬᠣᠶᠠᠳᠤᠭᠠᠷ ᠰᠠᠷ᠎ᠠ
February	Khoyordugaar sar	Qoyaduɣar sar-a
March	Гуравдугаар сар	ᠭᠤᠷᠪᠠᠳᠤᠭᠠᠷ ᠰᠠᠷ᠎ᠠ
March	Guravdugaar sar	Ɣurbaduɣar sar-a
April	Дөрөвдүгээр сар	ᠳᠥᠷᠪᠡᠳᠦᠭᠡᠷ ᠰᠠᠷ᠎ᠠ
April	Dörövdügeer sar	Dörbedüger sar-a
May	Тавдугаар сар	ᠲᠠᠪᠤᠳᠤᠭᠠᠷ ᠰᠠᠷ᠎ᠠ
May	Tavdugaar sar	Tabuduɣar sar-a
June	Зургаадугаар сар	ᠵᠢᠷᠭᠤᠳᠤᠭᠠᠷ ᠰᠠᠷ᠎ᠠ
June	Zurgaadugaar sar	J̌irɣuduɣar sar-a
July	Долоодугаар сар	ᠳᠣᠯᠣᠳᠤᠭᠠᠷ ᠰᠠᠷ᠎ᠠ
July	Doloodugaar sar	Doloduɣar sar-a
August	Наймдугаар сар	ᠨᠠᠢ᠌ᠮᠠᠳᠤᠭᠠᠷ ᠰᠠᠷ᠎ᠠ
August	Naimdugaar sar	Naimaduɣar sar-a
September	Есдүгээр сар	ᠶᠢᠰᠦᠳᠦᠭᠡᠷ ᠰᠠᠷ᠎ᠠ
September	Yesdügeer sar	Yisüdüger sar-a
October	Аравдугаар сар	ᠠᠷᠪᠠᠳᠤᠭᠠᠷ ᠰᠠᠷ᠎ᠠ
October	Aravdugaar sar	Arbaduɣar sar-a
November	Арваннэгдүгээр сар	ᠠᠷᠪᠠᠨ ᠨᠢᠭᠡᠳᠦᠭᠡᠷ ᠰᠠᠷ᠎ᠠ
November	Arvannegdügeer sar	Arban nigedüger sar-a
December	Арванхоёрдугаар сар	ᠠᠷᠪᠠᠨ ᠬᠣᠶᠠᠳᠤᠭᠠᠷ ᠰᠠᠷ᠎ᠠ
December	Arvankhoyordugaar sar	Arban qoyaduɣar sar-a

=== Days of the week ===
In colloquial usage, the first 5 days of the week are referred to as first day, second day, etc. Saturday is referred to as Хагас сайн өдөр (Khagas sain ödör, "half-good day"), and Sunday is referred to as Бүтэн сайн өдөр (Büten sain ödör, "full good day"); a result of 5 full working days and Saturday as a half working day during the communist era.

The names of Tibetan origin are used in more formal settings, and almost exclusively in written documents, while the Sanskrit names are practically absent in modern usage.

English name	Colloquial		Tibetan origin		Sanskrit origin		
English name	Cyrillic	Traditional	Cyrillic	Traditional	Cyrillic	Traditional	Meaning
Monday	Нэг дэх өдөр	ᠨᠢᠭᠡᠳᠡᠬᠢ ᠡᠳᠦᠷ	Даваа гараг	ᠳᠠᠸᠠ ᠭᠠᠷᠠᠭ	Сумьяа	ᠰᠤᠮᠢᠶ᠎ᠠ	Chandra
Monday	Neg dekh ödör	Nigedeki edür	Davaa garag	Dawa ɣarag	Sum'yaa	Sumiy-a	Chandra
Tuesday	Хоёр дахь өдөр	ᠬᠣᠶᠠᠳᠠᠬᠢ ᠡᠳᠦᠷ	Мягмар гараг	ᠮᠢᠭᠮᠠᠷ ᠭᠠᠷᠠᠭ	Ангараг	ᠠᠩᠭᠠᠷᠠᠭ	Mangala
Tuesday	Khoyor dakh' ödör	Qoyadaki edür	Myagmar garag	Miɣmar ɣarag	Angarag	Aŋɣarag	Mangala
Wednesday	Гурав дахь өдөр	ᠭᠤᠷᠪᠠᠳᠠᠬᠢ ᠡᠳᠦᠷ	Лхагва гараг	ᡀᠠᠭᠪᠠ ᠭᠠᠷᠠᠭ	Буд	ᠪᠤᠳ᠋	Budha
Wednesday	Gurav dakh' ödör	Ɣurbadaki edür	Lkhagva garag	Lhaɣba ɣarag	Bud	Bud	Budha
Thursday	Дөрөв дэх өдөр	ᠳᠥᠷᠪᠡᠳᠡᠬᠢ ᠡᠳᠦᠷ	Пүрэв гараг	ᠫᠦᠷᠪᠦ ᠭᠠᠷᠠᠭ	Бархасбадь	ᠪᠠᠷᠬᠠᠰᠪᠠᠳᠢ	Brihaspati
Thursday	Döröv dekh ödör	Dörbedeki edür	Pürev garag	Pürbü ɣarag	Barkhasbad'	Barqasbadi	Brihaspati
Friday	Тав дахь өдөр	ᠲᠠᠪᠤᠳᠠᠬᠢ ᠡᠳᠦᠷ	Баасан гараг	ᠪᠠᠰᠠᠩ ᠭᠠᠷᠠᠭ	Сугар	ᠱᠤᠭᠠᠷ᠎ᠠ	Shukra
Friday	Tav dakh' ödör	Tabudaki edür	Baasan garag	Basaŋ ɣarag	Sugar	Šuɣar-a	Shukra
Saturday	Хагас сайн өдөр	ᠬᠠᠭᠠᠰ ᠰᠠᠶᠢᠨ ᠡᠳᠦᠷ	Бямба гараг	ᠪᠢᠮᠪᠠ ᠭᠠᠷᠠᠭ	Санчир	ᠰᠠᠨᠢᠴᠠᠷ	Shani
Saturday	Khagas sain ödör	Qaɣas sayin edür	Бямба гараг	ᠪᠢᠮᠪᠠ ᠭᠠᠷᠠᠭ	Санчир	ᠰᠠᠨᠢᠴᠠᠷ	Shani
Saturday	Зургаа дахь өдөр	ᠵᠢᠷᠭᠤᠭᠠᠳᠠᠬᠢ ᠡᠳᠦᠷ	Бямба гараг	ᠪᠢᠮᠪᠠ ᠭᠠᠷᠠᠭ	Санчир	ᠰᠠᠨᠢᠴᠠᠷ	Shani
Saturday	Zurgaa dakh' ödör	J̌irɣuɣadaki edür	Byamba garag	Bimba ɣarag	Sanchir	Saničar	Shani
Sunday	Бүтэн сайн өдөр	ᠪᠦᠲᠦᠨ ᠰᠠᠶᠢᠨ ᠡᠳᠦᠷ	Ням гараг	ᠨᠢᠮ᠎ᠠ ᠭᠠᠷᠠᠭ	Адьяа	ᠠᠳᠢᠶ᠎ᠠ	Surya
Sunday	Büten sain ödör	Bütün sayin edür	Ням гараг	ᠨᠢᠮ᠎ᠠ ᠭᠠᠷᠠᠭ	Адьяа	ᠠᠳᠢᠶ᠎ᠠ	Surya
Sunday	Долоо дахь өдөр	ᠳᠣᠯᠣᠭᠠᠳᠠᠬᠢ ᠡᠳᠦᠷ	Ням гараг	ᠨᠢᠮ᠎ᠠ ᠭᠠᠷᠠᠭ	Адьяа	ᠠᠳᠢᠶ᠎ᠠ	Surya
Sunday	Doloo dakh' ödör	Doloɣadaki edür	Nyam garag	Nim-a ɣarag	Ad'yaa	Adiy-a	Surya

== See also ==
- Public holidays in Mongolia
