= Yusi, Liaoning =

Yusi 于寺镇 ᠶ‍ᠦᠰ‍ᠢ ᠬᠣᠲᠠ
- Town
- Location in Liaoning
- Coordinates: 42°11′40″N 121°11′33″E
- Country: People's Republic of China
- Province: Liaoning
- Prefecture-level city: Fuxin
- Autonomous county: Fuxin Mongol Autonomous County
- Time zone: UTC+8 (China Standard)

Yusi (Chinese: 于寺; pinyin: Yúsì) Yuüsi (Mongolian: ᠶ‍ᠦᠰ‍ᠢ; Юүси) is a town in Fuxin Mongol Autonomous County, Fuxin, Liaoning province, China. As of 2020, it has eleven villages under its administration:

- Yusi Village
- Guilinshutai Village (桂林束台村)
- Ping'andi Village (平安地村)
- Balipu Village (八里堡村)
- Zhalanboluo Village (扎兰波罗村)
- Huzhanggou Village (虎掌沟村)
- Mangniuwa Village (牤牛洼村)
- Yangjiawopu Village (杨家窝堡村)
- Guanyingzi Village (官营子村)
- Tabengai Village (他本改村)
- Shalitu Village (沙力土村)

== See also ==
- List of township-level divisions of Liaoning
