= Tsagaan Sar =

First day of the year according to the Mongolian lunar calendar

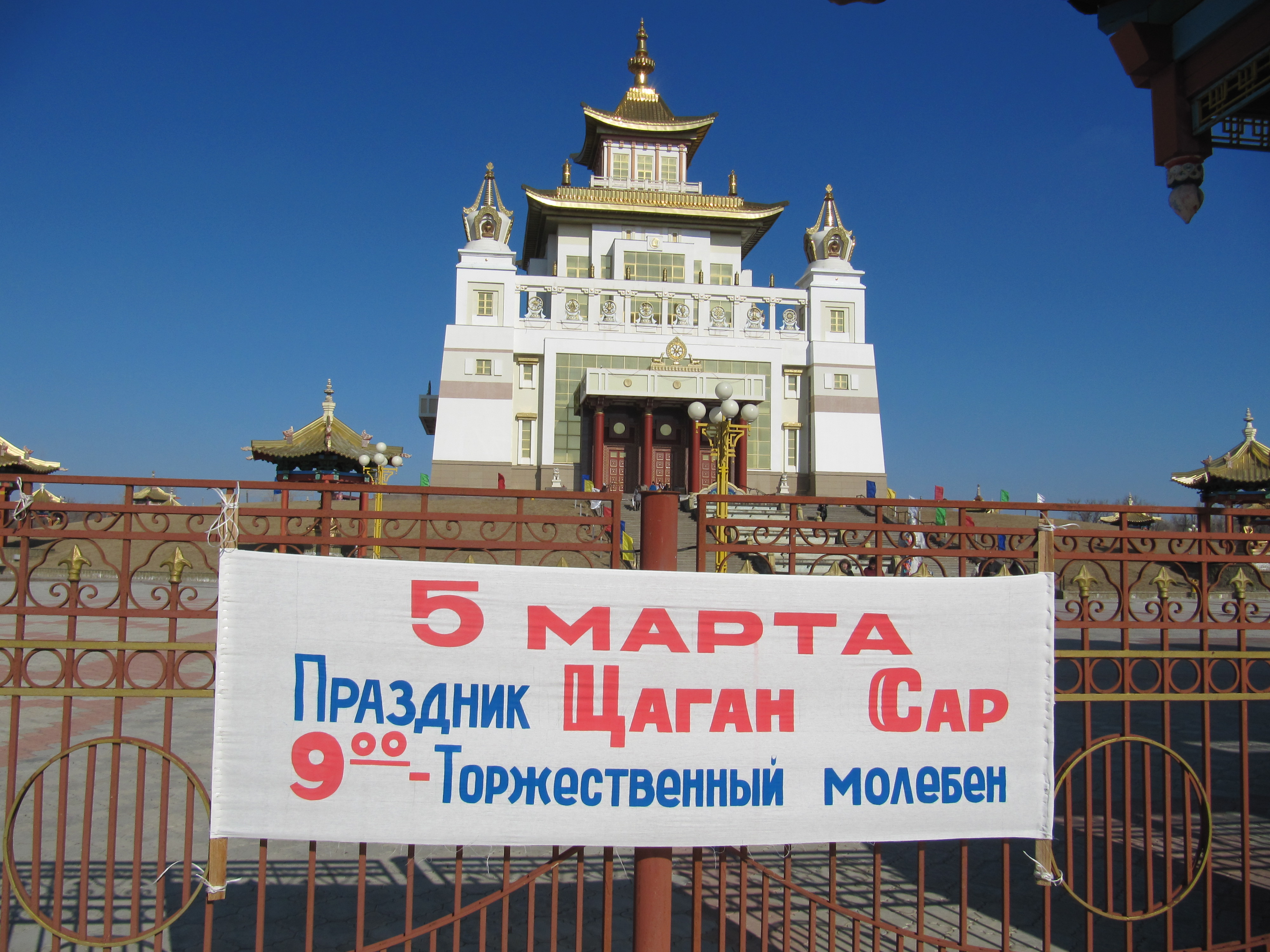
- Tsagaan Sar at Burkhan Bakshin Altan Sume, Elista, Kalmykia, Russia (2011)
- Also called: Mongolian New Year; Mongol New Year; Tsagaan Sar; Sagaalgan; Tsahan Sar
- Observed by: Mongolia; Russia (Agin-Buryat Okrug, Altai Republic, Buryatia, Kalmykia, Tuva, Ust-Orda Buryat Okrug); China (Bayingolin, Bortala, Dorbod, Fuxin, Haixi, Harqin Zuoyi, Henan, Hoboksar, Inner Mongolia, Qian Gorlos, Subei, Weichang) Ethnic groups: Altai; Buryats; Daurs; Oirats and Kalmyks; Manchus; Mongols; Monguors; Sibes; Tozhus; Tubalar; Tuvans
- Type: Cultural (Mongolian); Religious (Buddhist and Shamanist)
- Significance: New Year holiday
- 2025 date: 1 March
- 2026 date: 18 February
- Duration: 3 days
- Frequency: Annual
- Related to: Sagaalgan (Buryatia, Russia), Shagaa (Tuva, Russia), Tsagan Sar (Kalmykia, Russia), Chaga Bayram (Altai, Russia), Yhyakh (Sakha, Russia), Quviasukvik (Arctic Circle)

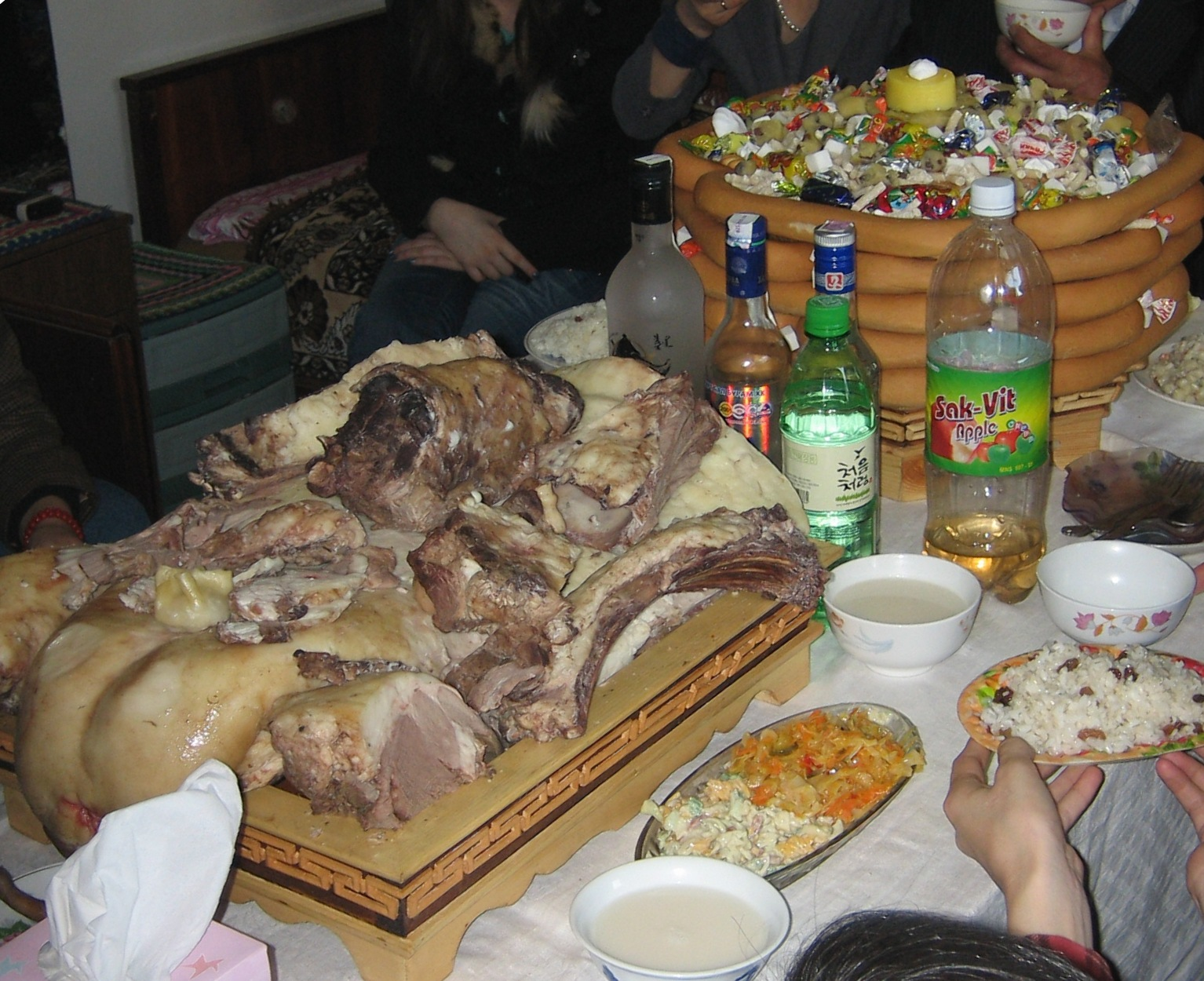
Tsagaan Sar meal

The Mongolian Lunar New Year, commonly known as Tsagaan Sar (Mongolian: Цагаан сар ᠴᠠᠭᠠᠨ ᠰᠠᠷ᠎ᠠ [tsʰɐʁáːɴ sɐr̥]; lit. 'White Moon'), (Note: Buryat: Сагаан һара / Сагаалган, romanized: Sagaan hara / Sagaalgan, pronounced [sɐˈʁaːɴ ˌharɐ, sɐˈʁaːlɢɐɴ]; Kalmyk: Цаһан сар, romanized: Cahan sar, pronounced [tsʰaʁáɴ sar̥]; Tuvan: Шагаа, romanized: Şagaa, pronounced [ɕɐʁɐ́ː]; Russian: Цаган Сар) is the first day of the year according to the Mongolian lunisolar calendar. The festival of the Lunar New Year is celebrated by Mongolic and some Turkic peoples. The holiday has shamanistic influences.

== Timing ==
The White Moon festival is celebrated on the first through third days of the first lunar month. Tsagaan Sar is one of the most important Mongolian holidays. Originally, it was celebrated in spring. Tsagaan Sar falls on the same date as Losar (Tibetan New Year) in Mongolia, while the Mongols in China falls on the same date as the Chinese Lunar New Year.

== History ==
The Mongols of Genghis Khan used the twelve-year animal cycle to mark their chronology. The Secret History of the Mongols written in 1240 as well as many letters of the Khans extensively use the twelve-year animal cycle. On the Year of the Red Hare, Genghis Khan ascended and purified himself on the first day of the lunar new year, wore new clothes, paid respects to Heaven and Earth, bowed and greeted his mother Hoelun and took part in a ceremony in his palace. On the first day of the lunar new year of the Year of the Rat (1216), Genghis Khan distributed gold presents to people aged over 60.

Marco Polo describes a Mongolian Lunar New Year (White Moon) celebrated by Kublai Khan in the 13th century during the Yuan dynasty. In Book Two, Part One he writes:

The beginning of their New Year is the month of February, and on that occasion the Great Khan and all his subjects made such a Feast as I now shall describe. It is the custom that on this occasion the Khan and all his subjects should be clothed entirely in white; so, that day, everybody is in white, men and women, great and small. And this is done in order that they may thrive all through the year, for they deem that white clothing is lucky. On that day also all the people of all the provinces and governments and kingdoms and countries that owe allegiance to the Khan bring him great presents of gold and silver, and pearls and gems, and rich textures of diverse kinds. And this they do that the Emperor throughout the year may have abundance of treasure and enjoyment without care. And the people also make presents to each other of white things, and embrace and kiss and make merry, and wish each other happiness and good luck for the coming year.

After the Red Turban Rebellion resulted in the fall of the Yuan dynasty in 1368, the Northern Yuan dynasty continued Mongol traditions in the Mongol homeland. In contrast to the Naadam festival in summer which celebrates manly virtues Tsagaan Sar celebrates the softer virtues of peace and harmony. The color white represented especially by the white foods or "tsagaan idee" (various dairy products and rice with raisins) symbolize purity of intent. In Paragraph 254 of the Secret History of the Mongols the sons of Genghis Khan fight over who will succeed as next Khan. Genghis Khan sits silently as they fight. Khukhuchos speaks up and reprimands Chagatai (whose name, also written Tsagaadai, incidentally means White): "Chagatai, you have spoken careless words that have frozen the warm liver of your good queen mother, grieved her loving heart, dried her oil-like thoughts and curdled her milk white spirit." During Tsagaan Sar emphasis is placed on purity of intent or whiteness of spirit when visiting elder relatives. The greeting "Amar baina uu" (Are you in peace?) is said while the arms are extended with open palms showing no bad intention. The younger places his or her arms below the elder in a supporting fashion, both bow and embrace and the traditional Mongolian "sniff-kiss" is given by the elder on both cheeks. This traditional gesture is called zolgokh (greeting). Quarreling is taboo and emphasis is placed on genuine reconciliation. Gift-giving is central to Tsagaan Sar. A lavish feast is usually laid out to wish for happiness and prosperity in the coming year.

During the Qing Dynasty, the Mongolians followed the "shar zurhai" (yellow horoscope) to determine the day of the Lunar New Year. From 1911 onwards during the Bogd Khanate of Mongolia, the Mongolians have used the Tugs Bayasgalant horoscope which differs from the yellow horoscope on certain years.

In 2011, the holiday was nominated for UNESCO's Intangible cultural heritage list.

== Ceremony ==
The customs of Tsagaan Sar are significantly different depending on the region. In Mongolia around the New Year for example, families burn candles at the altar symbolizing Buddhist enlightenment. Also people greet each other with holiday-specific greetings such as Амар байна уу? (Amar baina uu?), meaning "Are you living peacefully?" Mongols also visit friends and family on this day and exchange gifts. A typical Mongol family will meet in the home dwelling of the eldest in the family. Many people will be dressed in a full garment of Mongolian traditional clothing. When greeting their elders during the White Moon festival, Mongols perform the zolgokh greeting, grasping them by their elbows to show support for them. The eldest receives greetings from each member of the family except for their spouse. During the greeting ceremony, family members hold long, typically blue, silk cloths called a khadag. After the ceremony, the extended family eats sheep's tail, mutton, rice with curds, dairy products, and buuz. It is also typical to drink airag and exchange gifts. Before the day, many Mongols had to clean their houses.

The day before Tsagaan Sar is called Bituun, the name of the lunar phase of a new or dark moon. The lunar phases are Bituun (dark moon), Shined (new crescent moon), Tergel (full moon), and Huuchid (waxing moon). On the Bituun day, people thoroughly clean around home, herders also clean the livestock barns and shades, to meet the New Year fresh. The Bituun ceremony also includes burning candles to symbolize enlightenment of the samsara and all sentient beings and putting three pieces of ice at the doorway so that the horse of the deity Palden Lhamo could drink as the deity is believed to visit every household on this day. In the evening, families gather together—usually immediate family, in contrast to the large feast gatherings of White Moon day — and see out the old year eating dairy products and buuz. Traditionally, Mongolians settle all issues and repay all debts from the old year by this day.

== Food ==
Depending on the region, food is prepared in a diverse array of forms. For example, the traditional food in Mongolia for the festival includes dairy products, rice with curds (tsagaa-цагаа) or rice with raisins (berees-бэрээс), a pyramid of traditional cookies erected on a large dish in a special fashion symbolising Mount Sumeru or Shambhala realm, a grilled side of sheep and minced beef or minced mutton steamed inside pastry, steamed dumplings known as buuz, horse meat and traditional cookies Boortsog. Tsagaan Sar is a lavish feast, requiring preparation days in advance, as the men and women make large quantities of buuz as a whole family, along with ul boov, a pastry reserved for both dessert and presentation.

== During the socialist era ==
During Mongolia's Socialist period, the government banned Tsagaan Sar after Choibalsan's death in 1952 and tried to replace it with a holiday called "Collective Herder's Day", but the holiday was practiced again after the 1990 Democratic Revolution in Mongolia.

== Dates ==
The Mongol calendar in the Tegus Buyantu (Төгсбуянт) system is a lunisolar calendar. The Tegus Buyantu astrology was developed by Mongol high priest Luvsandanzanjantsan (1639–1704), thought to be the first reincarnation of the Blama-yin Gegegen (Ламын гэгээн). Tsagaan Sar is celebrated on the first through third days of the first lunar month.

Gregorian year	Mongol year	Transliteration	Tsagaan Sar	Element and animal
1989	Цагаан	Tsagaan	7 February – 10 February	female earth Snake
1990	Машид согтонги	Mashid sogtongi	26 February – 28 February	male iron Horse
1991	Төрөлхтний эзэн	Törölkhtnii eeen	15 February – 17 February	female iron Sheep
1992	Ангира	Apgira	4 February – 7 February	male water Monkey
1993	Цогт нигурт	Tsogt nigurt	25 January – 30 January	female water Rooster
1994	Бода	Boda	11 February – 13 February	male wooden Dog
1995	Насан төгөлдөр	Nasan tögöldör	31 January – 5 February	female wooden Pig
1996	Баригч	Barigch	19 February – 21 February	male fire Mouse
1997	Эрхэт	Erkhet	8 February – 10 February	female fire Ox
1998	Олон үрт	Olon ürt	28 February – 2 March	male earth Tiger
1999	Согтох төгөлдөр	Sogtokh tögöldör	17 February – 19 February	female earth Rabbit
2000	Тийн дарагч	Tiin daragch	5 February – 8 February	male iron Dragon
2001	Сүргийн манлай	Sürgiin manlai	24 January – 26 January	female iron Snake
2002	Элдэв	Eldev	13 February – 15 February	male water Horse
2003	Наран	Naran	2 February – 4 February	female water Sheep
2004	Наран гэтэлгэгч	Naran getelgegch	21 February – 23 February	male wood Monkey
2005	Газар тэтгэгч	Gazar tetgegch	9 February – 11 February*	female wood Rooster
2006	Барагдашгүй	Baragdashgüi	30 January – 1 February	male fire Dog
2007	Хамгийг номхотгогч	Khamgiig nomkhotgogch	18 February – 20 February	female fire Pig
2008	Хотолыг баригч	Khotolyg barigch	8 February – 10 February	male earth Mouse
2009	Харшлалт	Kharshlalt	25 February – 27 February	female earth Ox
2010	Тийн урвагч	Tiin urvagch	14 February – 17 February	male iron Tiger
2011	Илжиг	Iljig	3 February – 5 February	female iron Rabbit
2012	Баясгалан	Bayasgalan	22 February – 25 February	male water Dragon
2013	Тийн ялагч	Tiin yalagch	11 February – 13 February	female water Snake
2014	Ялгуусан	Yalguusan	30 January – 1 February	male wood Horse
2015	Галзууруулагч	Galzuuruulagch	19 February – 21 February	female wood Sheep
2016	Муу нүүрт	Muu nuurt	9 February – 11 February	male fire Monkey
2017	Алтан унжлагат	Altan unjlagat	27 February – 1 March	female fire Rooster
2018	Тийн унжлагат	Tiin unjlagat	16 February – 18 February	male earth Dog
2019	Урвуулагч	Urvuulagch	5 February – 7 February	female earth Pig
2020	Хотол төгс	Khotol tugs	24 February – 26 February	white male iron Mouse
2021	Цөөвөр	Tsöövör	12 February – 14 February	white female Cow
2022	Буян үйлдэгч	Buyan uildegch	2 February – 4 February	water male Tiger
2023	Үзэсгэлэнт болгогч	Uzesgelent bolgogch	21 February – 23 February	black female Rabbit
2024	Хилэнт эм	Hilent em	10 February – 12 February	wood male Dragon
2025	Элдэв эрдэнэт	Eldev erdenet	1 March – 3 March	blue female Snake
2026	Сүрээр дарагч	Sureer daragch	18 February – 20 February	male red Horse

== See also ==
- List of Buddhist festivals
- Celebrations of Lunar New Year in other parts of Asia:
  - Chinese New Year (Spring Festival)
  - Korean New Year (Seollal)
  - Japanese New Year (Shōgatsu)
  - Taiwanese New Year (Kuè-nî)
  - Tibetan New Year (Losar)
  - Vietnamese New Year (Tết Nguyên Đán)
- Similar Asian Lunisolar New Year celebrations that occur in April:
  - Burmese New Year (Thingyan)
  - Cambodian New Year (Chaul Chnam Thmey)
  - Lao New Year (Pii Mai)
  - Sri Lankan New Year (Aluth Avuruddu)
  - Thai New Year (Songkran)
- Naadam
- Nowruz
- Ul boov
- Yhyakh
