= Yusi, Sichuan =

Yusi 喻寺镇
- Town
- Location in Sichuan
- Coordinates: 29°14′35″N 105°24′03″E
- Country: People's Republic of China
- Province: Sichuan
- Prefecture-level city: Luzhou
- County: Lu County
- Time zone: UTC+8 (China Standard)

Yusi (Chinese: 喻寺; pinyin: Yúsì) is a town in Lu County, Luzhou, Sichuan province, China. As of 2020, it administers the following two residential neighborhoods and 11 villages:

Neighborhoods

- Xingshun Community (兴顺社区)
- Tongyuan Community (桐远社区)

Villages

- Chentuo Village (陈沱村)
- Yafengyan Village (鸦峰岩村)
- Leida Village (雷达村)
- Guqiao Village (古桥村)
- Qixin Village (齐心村)
- Leiba Village (雷坝村)
- Xinqiao Village (新桥村)
- Zhouyan Village (周堰村)
- Tanba Village (谭坝村)
- Xinglong Village (兴隆村)
- Zhaonan Village (赵南村)

== See also ==
- List of township-level divisions of Sichuan
