= Lunisolar calendar =

Calendar with lunar month, solar year

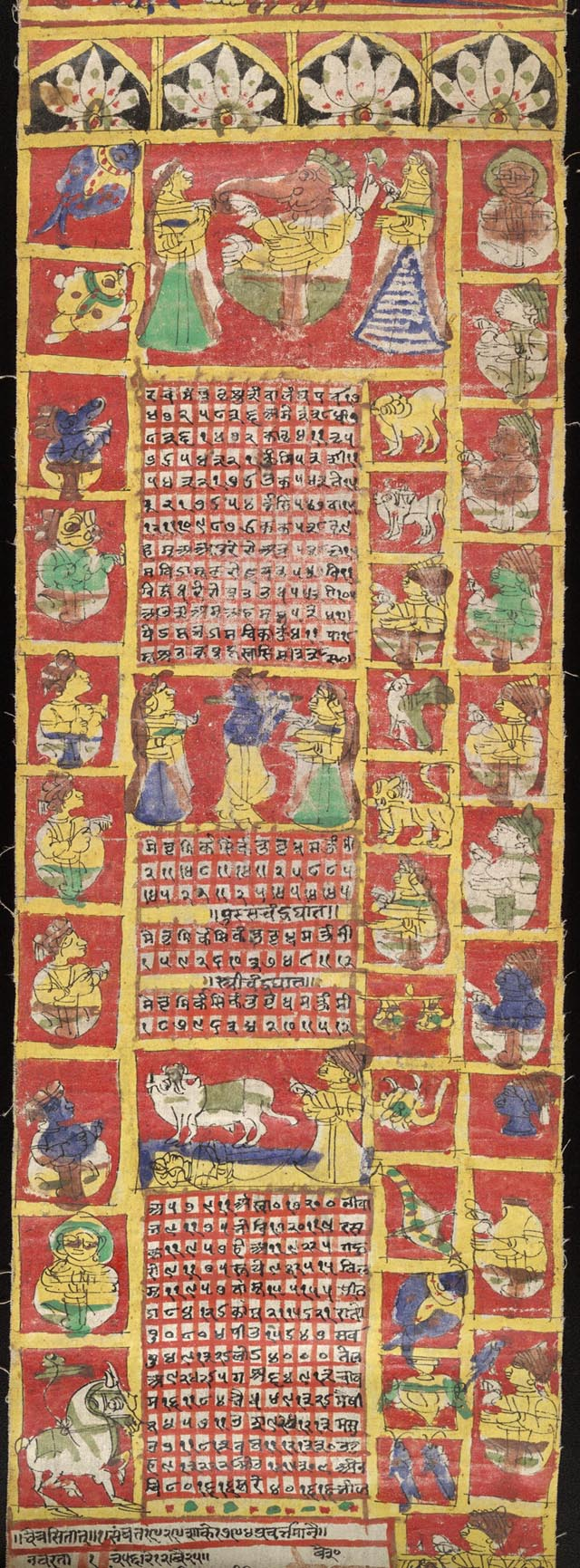
A page from the Hindu calendar 1871–72

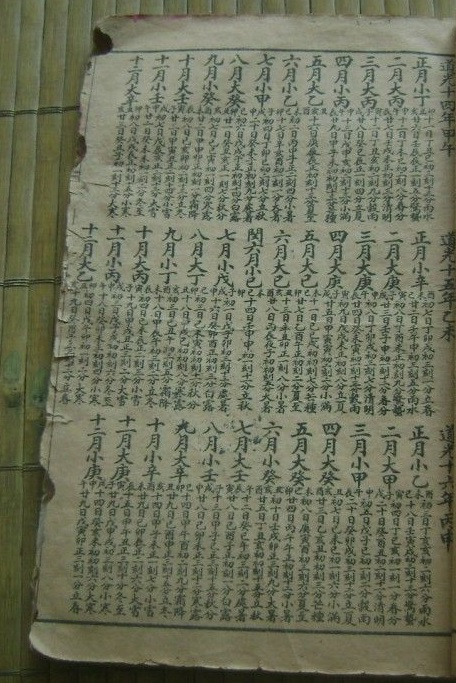
Record of the Chinese calendar for 1834, 1835, and 1836 during the Qing dynasty under the Daoguang Emperor's Reign (道光十四年, 道光十五年, 道光十六年)

A lunisolar calendar is a calendar that combines monthly lunar cycles with the solar year. As with all calendars which divide the year into months, there is an additional requirement that the year have a whole number of months (Moon cycles). The majority of years have twelve months but every second or third year is an embolismic year, which adds a thirteenth intercalary, embolismic, or leap month.

Lunisolar calendars are found in many cultures. In contrast to purely lunar calendars such as the Islamic calendar, lunisolar calendars have additional intercalation rules that reset them periodically into a rough agreement with the solar year and thus with the seasons.

== Reconciling lunar and solar cycles ==
=== Determining leap months ===
A tropical year is approximately 365.2422 days long and a synodic month is approximately 29.5306 days long, so a tropical year is approximately 365.2422 / 29.5306 ≈ 12.36826 months long. Because 0.36826 is between 1/3 and 1/2, a typical year of 12 months needs to be supplemented with one intercalary or leap month every 2 to 3 years. More precisely, 0.36826 is quite close to 7/19 (about 0.3684211): several lunisolar calendars have 7 leap months in every cycle of 19 years (called a 'Metonic cycle'). The Babylonians applied the 19-year cycle in the late sixth century BCE.

Intercalation of leap months is frequently controlled by the "epact", which is the difference between the lunar and solar years (approximately 11 days). The classic Metonic cycle can be reproduced by assigning an initial epact value of 1 to the last year of the cycle and incrementing by 11 each year. Between the last year of one cycle and the first year of the next the increment is 12 – the saltus lunae (Latin for 'leap of the moon') – which causes the epacts to repeat every 19 years. When the epact reaches 30 or higher, an intercalary month is added and 30 is subtracted. The Metonic cycle states that 7 of 19 years will contain an additional intercalary month and those years are numbered: 3, 6, 8, 11, 14, 17 and 19. Both the Hebrew calendar and the Julian calendar use this sequence.

The Buddhist and Hebrew calendars restrict the leap month to a single month of the year; the number of common months between leap months is, therefore, usually 36, but occasionally only 24 months. Because the Chinese and Hindu lunisolar calendars allow the leap month to occur after or before (respectively) any month but use the true apparent motion of the Sun, their leap months do not usually occur within a couple of months of perihelion, when the apparent speed of the Sun along the ecliptic is fastest (now about 3 January). This increases the usual number of common months between leap months to roughly 34 months when a doublet of common years occurs, while reducing the number to about 29 months when only a common singleton occurs.

=== With uncounted time ===
An alternative way of dealing with the fact that a solar year does not contain an integer number of lunar months is by including uncounted time in a period of the year that is not assigned to a named month. Some Coast Salish peoples used a calendar of this kind. For instance, the Chehalis began their count of lunar months from the arrival of spawning chinook salmon (in Gregorian calendar October), and counted 10 months, leaving an uncounted period until the next chinook salmon run.

== List of lunisolar calendars ==
The Chinese, Buddhist, Burmese, Assyrian, Hebrew, Jain, traditional Nepali, Hindu, Japanese, Korean, Mongolian, Tibetan, and Vietnamese calendars (in the East Asian Chinese cultural sphere), plus the ancient Hellenic, Coligny, and Babylonian calendars are all lunisolar. Also, some of the ancient pre-Islamic calendars in south Arabia followed a lunisolar system. The Chinese, Coligny and Hebrew (Note: The modern Hebrew calendar, since it is based on rules rather than observations, does not exactly track the tropical, and in fact the average Hebrew year of about 365.2468 days is intermediate between the tropical year (about 365.2422 days) and the sidereal year (about 365.2564 days).) lunisolar calendars track more or less the tropical year, whereas the Buddhist and Hindu lunisolar calendars track the sidereal year. Therefore, the first three give an idea of the seasons whereas the last two give an idea of the position among the constellations of the full moon.

The following is a list of lunisolar calendars sorted by family.

=== Babylonian ===
- Babylonian calendar family – common use of the Metonic cycle
  - Ancient Macedonian calendar
  - Hebrew calendar
  - Umma calendar

==== Lunisolar reckoning in the Christian calendars ====
The Gregorian calendar (the world's most commonly used) is a solar calendar, but the date of Easter is associated historically with the date of Passover in the Hebrew calendar. Western Christian churches use a lunar-based algorithm to determine the date of Easter and consequent movable feasts. Briefly, the date is determined with respect to the ecclesiastical full moon that follows the ecclesiastical equinox in March. (These events are determined by reference to the Metonic cycle, not astronomy.) The Eastern Christian churches have a similar algorithm that is based on the Julian calendar.

=== Hindu ===
- Hindu calendar family – shared astronomical roots
  - Vikram Samvat
  - Shaka Samvat
  - Buddhist calendar
  - Burmese calendar (Pyu calendar)
    - Chula Sakarat
  - Nepal Sambat
  - Thai lunar calendar
  - Vira Nirvana Samvat (Jain calendar)

=== Chinese ===
- Chinese calendar family – years start on second new moon after winter solstice (save for leaps)
  - Japanese calendar
  - Korean calendar
  - Mongolian calendar
  - Tibetan calendar
  - Vietnamese calendar

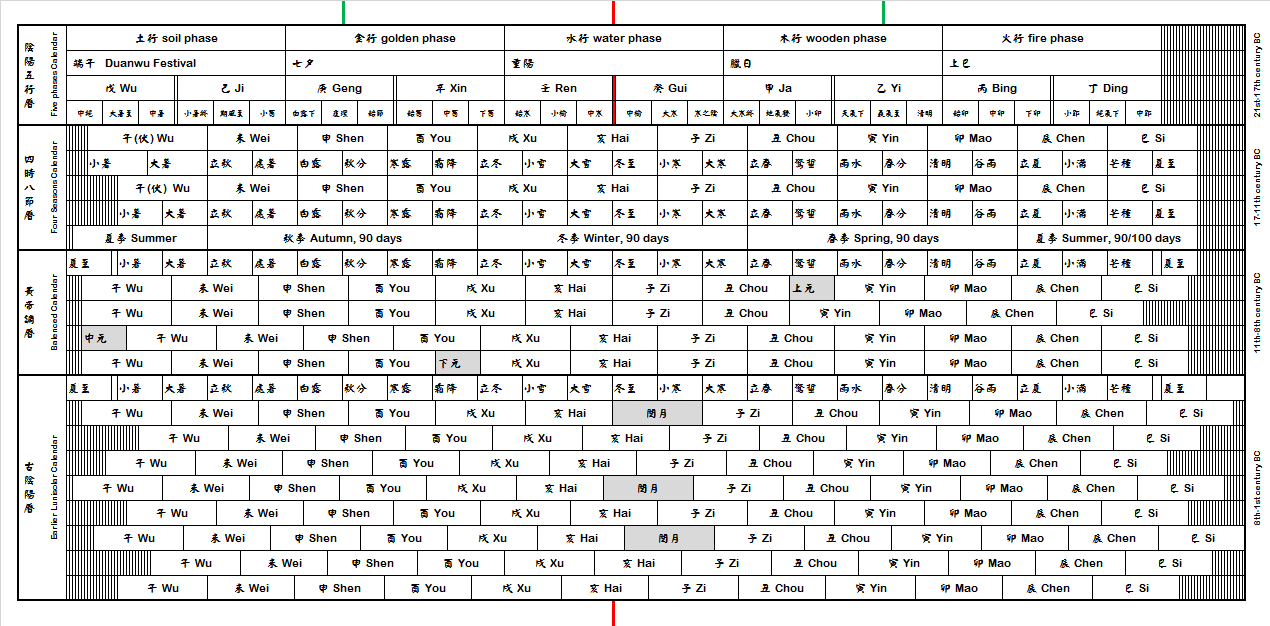
The Five Phases and Four Seasons of the traditional Chinese lunisolar calendar, with English translation.

The Chinese calendar (華夏曆法) or Chinese lunisolar calendar is also called Agricultural Calendar [農曆; 农历; Nónglì; 'farming calendar'], or Yin Calendar [陰曆; 阴历; Yīnlì; 'yin calendar']), as movements of the sun (representing Yang) and moon (representing Yin) are the references for the Chinese lunisolar calendar calculations. The Chinese lunisolar calendar is the origin of some variant calendars adopted by other neighboring countries, such as Vietnam and Korea.

Together with astronomical, horological, and phenological observations, definitions, measurements, and predictions of years, months, and days were refined. Astronomical phenomena and calculations emphasized especially the efforts to mathematically correlate the solar and lunar cycles from the perspective of the earth, which however are known to require some degree of numeric approximation or compromise.

The earliest record of the Chinese lunisolar calendar was in the Zhou dynasty (1050 BC – 771 BC, around 3,000 years ago.) Throughout history, the Chinese lunisolar calendar had many variations and evolved with different dynasties with increasing accuracy, including the "six ancient calendars" in the Warring States period, the Qin calendar in the Qin dynasty, the Han calendar or the Taichu calendar in the Han dynasty and Tang dynasty, the Shoushi calendar in the Yuan dynasty, and the Daming calendar in the Ming dynasty, etc. Starting in 1912, the western solar calendar is used together with the lunisolar calendar in China.

The most celebrated Chinese holidays, such as the Chinese New Year (華夏新年), Lantern Festival (元宵節), Mid-Autumn Festival (中秋節), and Dragon Boat Festival (端午節) are all based upon the Chinese lunisolar calendar. In addition, the popular Chinese zodiac is a classification scheme based on the Chinese calendar that assigns an animal and its reputed attributes to each year in a repeating twelve-year cycle. The traditional calendar used the sexagenary cycle-based ganzhi system's mathematically repeating cycles of Heavenly Stems and Earthly Branches.

=== Unclassified or independent ===
  - Attic calendar
  - A lunisolar calendar devised by Plethon, né Georgios Gemistos, in his Book of Laws
  - Ptolemic Egyptian calendar
  - Inca calendar
  - Celtic calendar, including Coligny calendar
  - Muisca calendar
  - Nisg̱a'a calendar
  - Old Eastern Ojibwe calendar

== See also ==
- Callippic cycle – Astronomical cycle lasting 76 years
- Calendar reform – Significant revision of a calendar system
- List of calendars
- Nasi' – Aspect of the pre-Islamic Arabian calendar
- Roman calendar – Calendar used in Ancient Rome. A likely lunisolar calendar with common years of 355 days and leap years of 378 days
- Runic calendar – Perpetual calendar based on the 19-year-long Metonic cycle of the Moon
