= Fuxin Mongol Autonomous County =

Fuxin 阜新县 ᠹᠦᠰᠢᠨ ᠦ ᠰᠢᠶᠠᠨ
- Autonomous county
- 阜新蒙古族自治县 ᠹᠦᠰᠢᠨ ᠦ ᠮᠣᠩᠭᠣᠯ ᠦᠨᠳᠦᠰᠦᠲᠡᠨ ᠦ ᠥᠪᠡᠷᠲᠡᠭᠡᠨ ᠵᠠᠰᠠᠬᠤ ᠰᠢᠶᠠᠨ; Fuxin Mongol Autonomous County
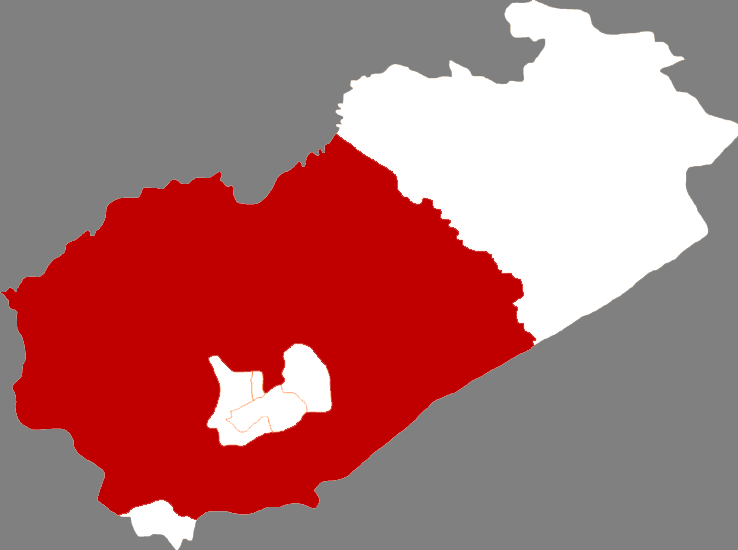
- Location in Fuxin City

- Location in Liaoning
- Coordinates: 42°04′N 121°45′E
- Country: China
- Province: Liaoning
- Prefecture-level city: Fuxin
- County seat: Fuxin Town

Area
  - Total: 6,217.89 km^{2} (2,400.74 sq mi)
- Elevation: 249 m (817 ft)

Population (2020 census)
  - Total: 545,749
  - Density: 87.7708/km^{2} (227.325/sq mi)
- Time zone: UTC+8 (China Standard)
- Website: www.fmx.gov.cn

Fuxin Mongol Autonomous County

Chinese name
- Simplified Chinese: 阜新蒙古族自治县
- Traditional Chinese: 阜新蒙古族自治縣
Transcriptions
Standard Mandarin
- Hanyu Pinyin: Fùxīn Ménggǔzú Zìzhìxiàn

Mongolian name
- Mongolian Cyrillic: Фүшины Монгол үндэстэний өөртөө засах шянь
- Mongolian script: ᠹᠦᠰᠢᠨ ᠦ ᠮᠣᠩᠭᠣᠯ ᠦᠨᠳᠦᠰᠦᠲᠡᠨ ᠦ ᠥᠪᠡᠷᠲᠡᠭᠡᠨ ᠵᠠᠰᠠᠬᠤ ᠰᠢᠶᠠᠨ

Fuxin Mongol Autonomous County (Chinese: 阜新蒙古族自治县), or simply Fuxin County (阜新县), is a county in the west of Liaoning of Northeast China. It is under the administration of Fuxin City.

== Administrative divisions ==
Fuxin County is divided into 1 subdistrict, 32 towns and 3 townships.

Name	Simplified Chinese	Hanyu Pinyin	Mongolian (Hudum Script)	Mongolian (Cyrillic)	Administrative division code
Subdistrict
Chengqu Subdistrict	城区街道	Chéngqū jiēdào	ᠬᠣᠲᠠ ᠲᠣᠭᠣᠷᠢᠭ ᠤᠨ ᠵᠡᠭᠡᠯᠢ ᠭᠤᠳᠤᠮᠵᠢ	Хот дугаргийн зээл гудамж	210921001
Towns
Fuxin Town	阜新镇	Fùxīn Zhèn	ᠹᠦᠰᠢᠨ ᠬᠣᠲᠠ	Фүшин хот	210921100
Dongliang Town	东梁镇	Dōngliáng Zhèn	ᠳ᠋ᠦᠩᠯᠢᠶᠠᠩ ᠬᠣᠲᠠ	Түнлиан хот	210921102
Fosi Town (Gegeen Sum)	佛寺镇	Fósì Zhèn	ᠭᠡᠭᠡᠨ ᠰᠦᠮ᠎ᠡ ᠬᠣᠲᠠ	Гэгээн сүм хот	210921103
Yamat Town (Yimatu)	伊吗图镇	Yīmatú Zhèn	ᠢᠮᠠᠭᠠᠲᠤ ᠬᠣᠲᠠ	Ямаат хот	210921104
Jiumiao Town (Huqin Sum)	旧庙镇	Jiùmiào Zhèn	ᠬᠠᠭᠤᠴᠢᠨ ᠰᠦᠮ᠎ᠡ ᠬᠣᠲᠠ	Хуучин сүм хот	210921105
Wuhuanchi Town (Oohonq)	务欢池镇	Wùhuānchí Zhèn	ᠥᠭᠡᠬᠦᠨᠴᠢ ᠬᠣᠲᠠ	Өөхөнч хот	210921106
Jianshe Town	建设镇	Jiànshè Zhèn	ᠵᠢᠶᠠᠨᠱᠧ ᠬᠣᠲᠠ	Жианше хот	210921107
Daba Town	大巴镇	Dàbā Zhèn	ᠳᠠᠪᠠᠭᠠ ᠬᠣᠲᠠ	Даваа хот	210921108
Paozi Town (Qagaan Nur)	泡子镇	Pāozǐ Zhèn	ᠴᠠᠭᠠᠨ ᠨᠠᠭᠤᠷ ᠬᠣᠲᠠ	Цагаан нуур хот	210921109
Shijiazi Town (Arban Ger)	十家子镇	Shíjiāzǐ Zhèn	ᠠᠷᠪᠠᠨ ᠭᠡᠷ ᠬᠣᠲᠠ	Арван гэр хот	210921110
Wangfu Town (Noyan Ger)	王府镇	Wángfǔ Zhèn	ᠨᠣᠶᠠᠨ ᠭᠡᠷ ᠬᠣᠲᠠ	Ноён гэр хот	210921111
Yusi Town	于寺镇	Yúsì Zhèn	ᠶ‍ᠦᠰ‍ᠢ ᠬᠣᠲᠠ	Юүси хот	210921112
Furong Town	富荣镇	Fùróng Zhèn	ᠹᠦᠷᠦᠩᠵᠧᠨ ᠬᠣᠲᠠ	Фуран хот	210921113
Xinmin Town (Biqgiin Ail)	新民镇	Xīnmín Zhèn	ᠪᠢᠴᠢᠭ᠌ ᠦᠨ ᠠᠢᠯ ᠬᠣᠲᠠ	Бичгийн айл хот	210921114
Fuxingdi Town (Aral)	福兴地镇	Fúxīngdì Zhèn	ᠠᠷᠠᠯ ᠬᠣᠲᠠ	Арал хот	210921115
Ping'andi Town	平安地镇	Píng'āndì Zhèn	ᠫᠢᠩ ᠠᠨ ᠳ᠋ᠢ ᠬᠣᠲᠠ	Пин аан ди хот	210921116
Shala Town (Xar Sum)	沙拉镇	Shālā Zhèn	ᠰᠢᠷ᠎ᠠ ᠰᠤᠮᠤ ᠬᠣᠲᠠ	Шар сум хот	210921117
Daguben Town (Ih Gurban Tolgoi)	大固本镇	Dàgùběn Zhèn	ᠶᠡᠬᠡ ᠭᠤᠷᠪᠠᠨ ᠲᠣᠯᠣᠭᠠᠢ ᠬᠣᠲᠠ	Их гурван толгой хот	210921118
Dawujiazi Town (Ih Taban Ger)	大五家子镇	Dàwǔjiāzǐ Zhèn	ᠶᠡᠬᠡ ᠲᠠᠪᠤᠨ ᠭᠡᠷ ᠬᠣᠲᠠ	Их таван гэр хот	210921119
Daben Town (Toshiin Ail)	大板镇	Dàbǎn Zhèn	ᠲᠣᠰᠬᠤ ᠶᠢᠨ ᠠᠢᠯ ᠬᠣᠲᠠ	Тусахын айл хот	210921120
Zhaoshugou Town (Jos)	招束沟镇	Zhāoshùgōu Zhèn	ᠵᠣᠰᠣ ᠬᠣᠲᠠ	Зос хот	210921121
Bajiazi Town	八家子镇	Bājiāzǐ Zhèn	ᠪᠠ ᠵᠢᠶᠠ ᠽᠢ ᠬᠣᠲᠠ	Ба жье зи хот	210921122
Zhizhushan Town (Aaljin Had)	蜘蛛山镇	Zhīzhūshān Zhèn	ᠠᠭᠠᠯᠵᠢᠨ ᠬᠠᠳᠠ ᠬᠣᠲᠠ	Аалзан хад хот	210921123
Tayingzi Town (Subargan Ail)	塔营子镇	Tǎyíngzǐ Zhèn	ᠰᠤᠪᠤᠷᠭᠠᠨ ᠠᠢᠯ ᠬᠣᠲᠠ	Суварган айл хот	210921124
Zhalanyingzi Town (Jalan Ail)	扎兰营子镇	Zhālányíngzǐ Zhèn	ᠵᠠᠯᠠᠨ ᠠᠢᠯ ᠬᠣᠲᠠ	Залан айл хот	210921125
Qijiazi Town (Dolon Ger)	七家子镇	Qījiāzǐ Zhèn	ᠳᠣᠯᠣᠭᠠᠨ ᠭᠡᠷ ᠬᠣᠲᠠ	Долоон гэр хот	210921126
Hongmaozi Town (Ayuxiin Horoo)	红帽子镇	Hóngmàozǐ Zhèn	ᠠᠶᠤᠰᠢ ᠶᠢᠨ ᠬᠣᠷᠣᠭ᠎ᠠ ᠬᠣᠲᠠ	Аюушийн хороо хот	210921127
Zidutai Town (Jurgaad)	紫都台镇	Zǐdūtái Zhèn	ᠵᠢᠷᠭᠤᠭᠠᠳ ᠬᠣᠲᠠ	Зургаад хот	210921128
Huxig Town (Huashige)	化石戈镇	Huàshígē Zhèn	ᠬᠤᠰᠢᠭ᠎ᠠ ᠬᠣᠲᠠ	Хушга хот	210921129
Had Huxu Town (Hadahushao)	哈达户稍镇	Hādáhùshāo Zhèn	ᠬᠠᠳᠠ ᠬᠣᠰᠢᠭᠤ ᠬᠣᠲᠠ	Хад хошуу хот	210921130
Laohetu Town (Lohot)	老河土镇	Lǎohétǔ Zhèn	ᠯᠣᠬᠣᠲᠤ ᠬᠣᠲᠠ	Лохоот хот	210921131
Taiping Town (Turgen Tabi)	太平镇	Tàipíng Zhèn	ᠲᠦᠷᠭᠡᠨ ᠲᠠᠪᠢ ᠬᠣᠲᠠ	Түргэн тавь хот	210921132
Townships
Wofenggou Township	卧凤沟乡	Wòfènggōu Xiāng	ᠸᠧᠹᠧᠩ ᠭᠣᠣᠯ ᠰᠢᠶᠠᠩ	Вефен гол сум	210921203
Cangtu Township (Sangt Horoo)	苍土乡	Cāngtǔ Xiāng	ᠰᠠᠩᠲᠤ ᠬᠣᠷᠣᠭ᠎ᠠ ᠰᠢᠶᠠᠩ	Сант хороо сум	210921211
Guohua Township (Ih Ger)	国华乡	Guóhuá Xiāng	ᠶᠡᠬᠡ ᠭᠡᠷ ᠰᠢᠶᠠᠩ	Их гэр сум	210921222
