= Bansh =

Type of Mongolian dumpling

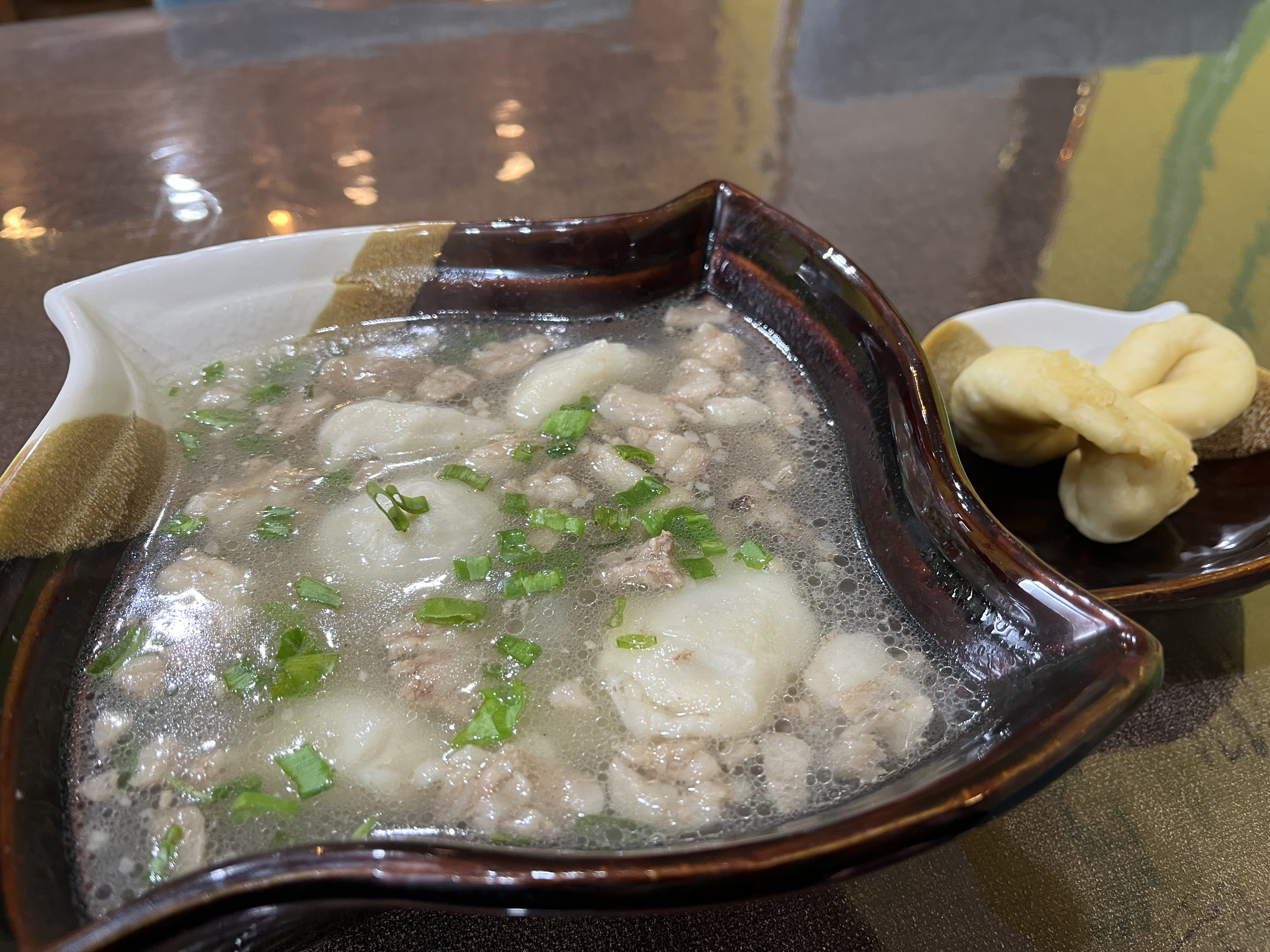
- Traditional Mongolian bansh in soup
- Type: Dumpling
- Course: Main course, snack
- Place of origin: Mongolia
- Region or state: Central Asia
- Cooking time: 10 minutes to 20 minutes
- Serving temperature: Hot
- Main ingredients: Dough (flour, water), minced meat (mutton or beef), onion, garlic, spices
- Variations: Boiled, fried
- Similar dishes: Buuz

Bansh (Mongolian: Банш) is a type of traditional Mongolian dumpling commonly prepared and consumed across Mongolia. It is similar to buuz, another popular Mongolian dumpling, but differs in size and preparation method. While buuz is typically steamed, bansh is smaller and often boiled or cooked in soups.

== Preparation ==
Bansh is made using dough and a filling. The dough is prepared from flour, water, and sometimes a pinch of salt, then rolled into thin sheets and cut into small circles. The filling usually consists of minced meat—commonly mutton or beef—mixed with onions, garlic, salt, and black pepper. Once the filling is placed on the dough, the edges are pinched together to form small, sealed dumplings.

== Cooking methods ==
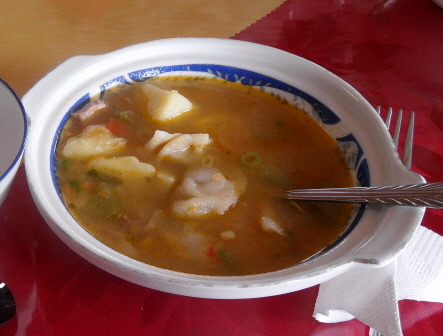
Bansh in soup

There are two primary ways to cook bansh:

1. Boiled Bansh: The dumplings are boiled in water or broth, often alongside vegetables or seasonings to create a hearty soup. Bansh are also cooked in milk tea to make banshtai tsai.
2. Fried Bansh: The dumplings are fried in oil or fat, which gives them a crispy texture and rich flavor.

== Cultural significance ==
Bansh is an integral part of Mongolian cuisine and is often prepared for family gatherings, celebrations, or as a comfort food during the cold winters. It is also a common dish for everyday meals due to its simplicity and versatility.

== Variations ==
There are regional variations of bansh in Mongolia, with differences in the filling and cooking methods depending on local ingredients and culinary traditions. For example, some versions may include herbs or vegetables in the filling.

== Related dishes ==
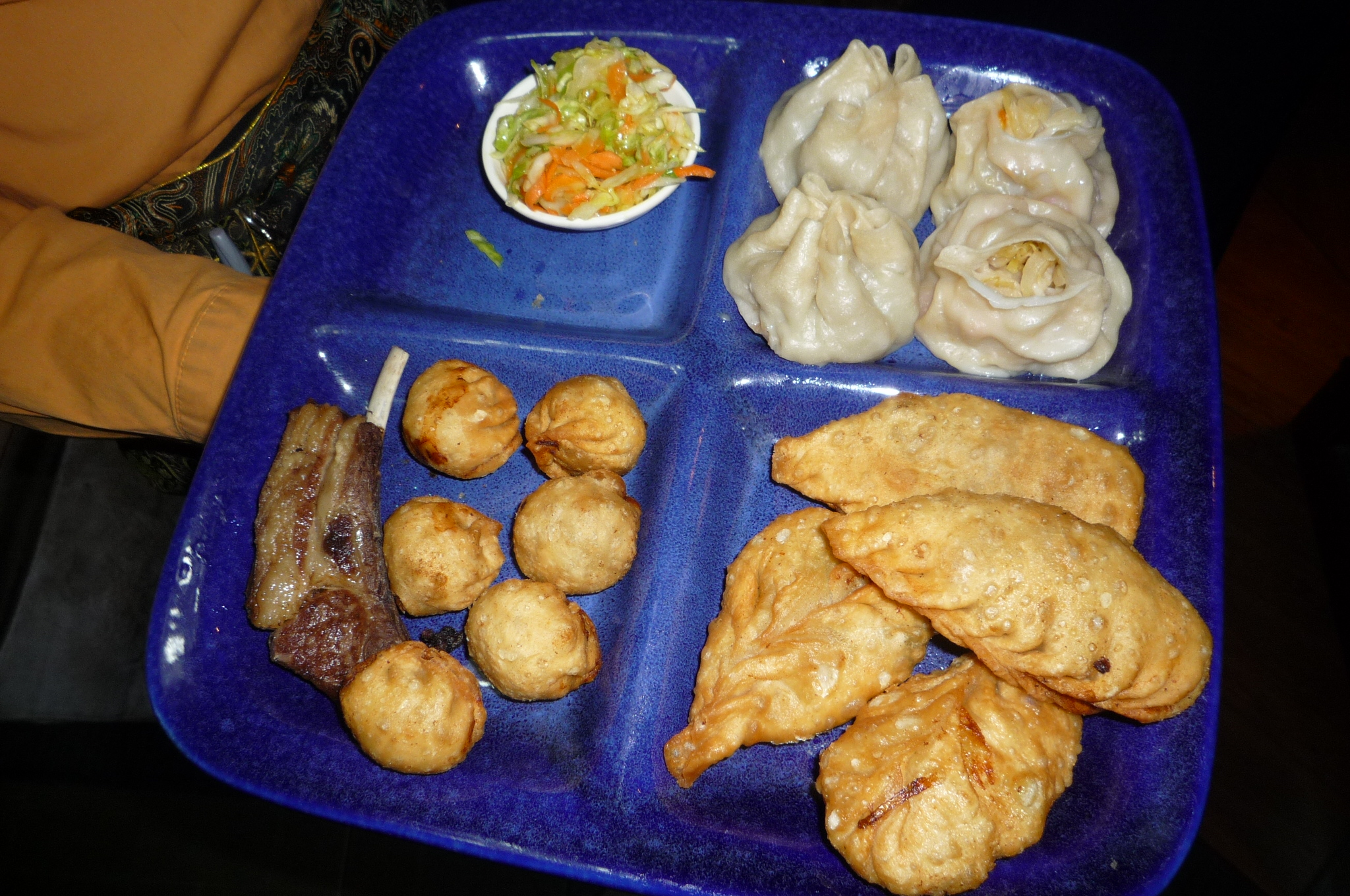
Bansh, buuz, and khuushuur

- Buuz: Larger steamed dumplings with similar fillings.
- Khuushuur: A deep-fried meat-filled pastry.
- Tsuivan: A noodle dish often complemented by dumplings or meat.

== See also ==
- Mongolian cuisine
- Dumpling
