= Sülen =

Mongolian hot pot dish

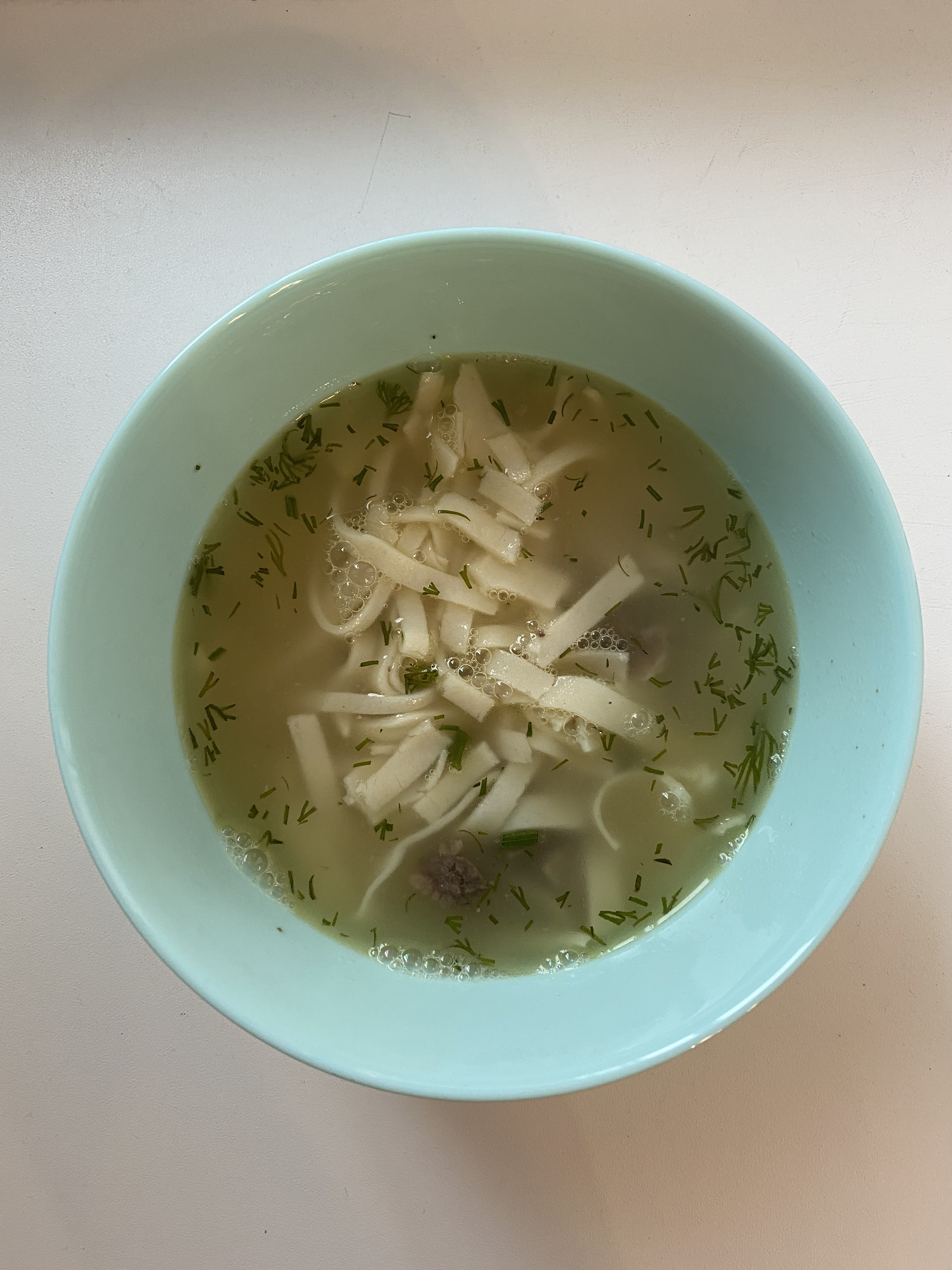
Sülen

Sülen are the so-called "boiled pot" dishes of ancient Mongolian cuisine. They are the most significant category of dishes attested to in the Yinshan Zhengyao (YSZY), making up 12.3% off the 219 recorded recipes of the Khan's court. The texture of dishes cooked by the boiling pot method varies from pilafs and very thick stews to soups, all the recipes in Juan 1 of the YSZY were made using the same base mutton and cardamom broth as a cooking liquid.

== Background ==
The sülen dishes are part of the Mongol tradition of cooking whatever was on hand in a pot of hot mutton broth. Usually poor cuts of mutton or offal would be used, with bones for the broth, thickened with legumes or grains and most often flavored with onion and chives.

The term appears in the Secret History of the Mongols, possibly distinguished from umdan (drinks). The most common ways of preparing meat in Mongolian cuisine were roasting and boiling with sülen as the accepted term for the hot pot style of boiled meats.

== Preparation & Ingredients ==
Mutton and cardamom are the principal ingredients of the base cooking broth, with the addition of galangal present in seven of the 27 recipes, and cinnamon used just once. The most common ingredients are vinegar, chives, leeks and onions, used in over half the recipes. Ginger, sheep offal, black pepper, coriander leaves and "sheep liver sauce" also appear in several of the YSZY recipes.

Pureed chickpea is added to the soup as a thickener in over half the recipes. One recipe combines fenugreek seeds with the chickpea mash. Others add rice, barley or oleaster fruits, in some cases creating a very thick grain dish instead of a soup.

== Mughal court cuisine ==
The 16th century Ain-i-Akbari of the Mughal court contained a recipe for shölen made with chickpeas and rice.
