= Kuzu haşlama =

Mutton or lamb stew from Turkey

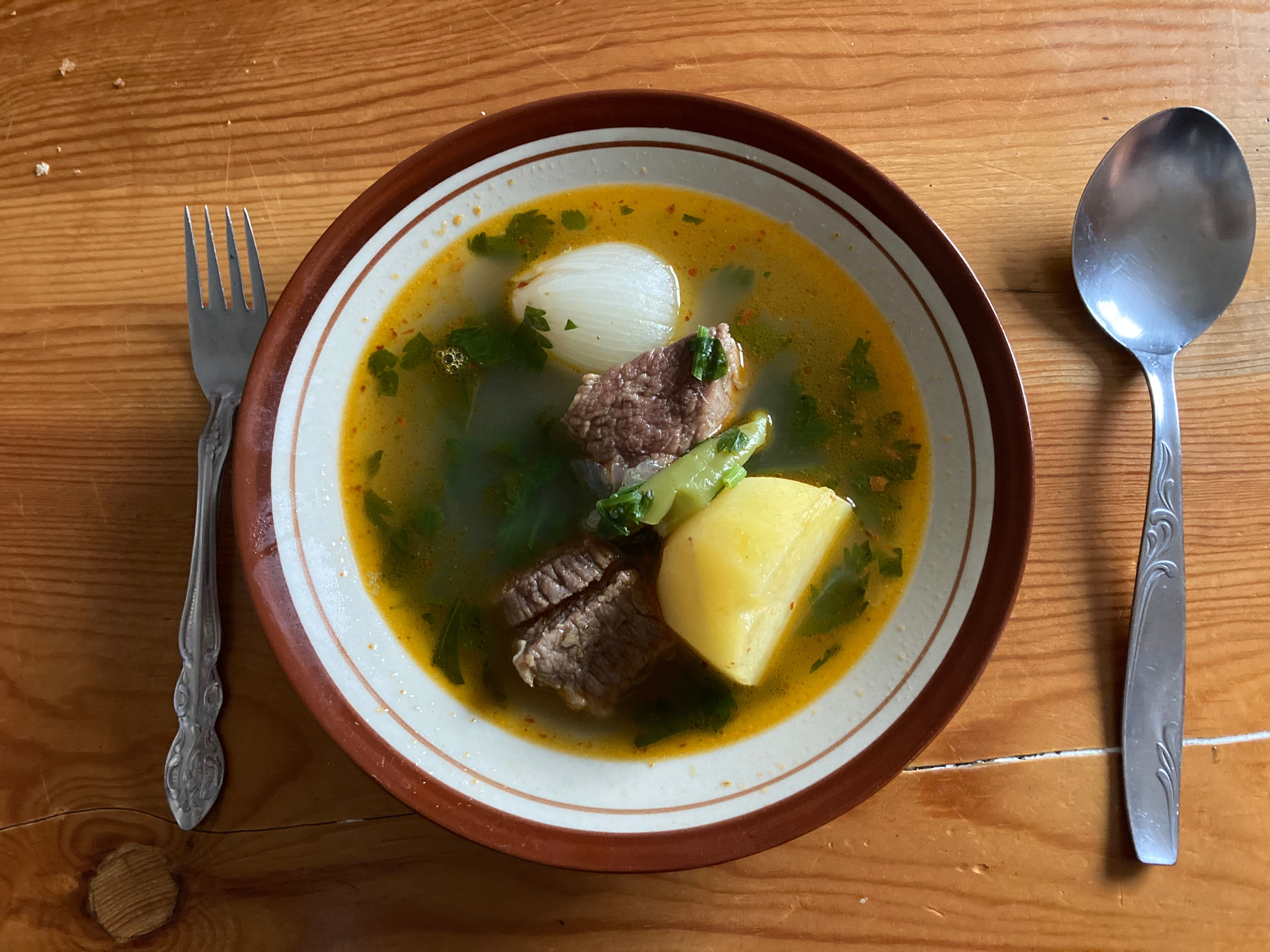
Haşlama

Kuzu haşlama is a Turkish dish of bone-in lamb (usually shank or shoulder) that is boiled with vegetables like onions, potatoes and carrots. Some variations include zucchini, celery root, or chickpeas.

== Background ==
Charles Perry notes that there is no known ancient Turkic word for boiled meat dishes, though the Persian word shorba has come to mean meat soup or broth in various Turkic languages.

== Preparation ==
The simple broth is flavored with salt, garlic, whole black peppercorns and spices which may include dried mint, aleppo pepper, and bay leaves. The shanks are first briefly sauteed with the ring-cut onions. The water is added, and bone-in lamb is boiled for about an hour before the vegetables are added. The dish may also be made terbiyeli, a variation that includes a sauce made from egg yolk, yogurt, flour and lemon juice that is added shortly before the dish is finished cooking. The finished dish is often garnished with fresh parsley. Beef may be substituted for lamb, in which case it is called dana haşlama. It is prepared the same way, and like the lamb version, it may optionally be served terbiyeli.

== See also ==
- Khorkhog
