= Suutei tsai =

Traditional Mongolian beverage

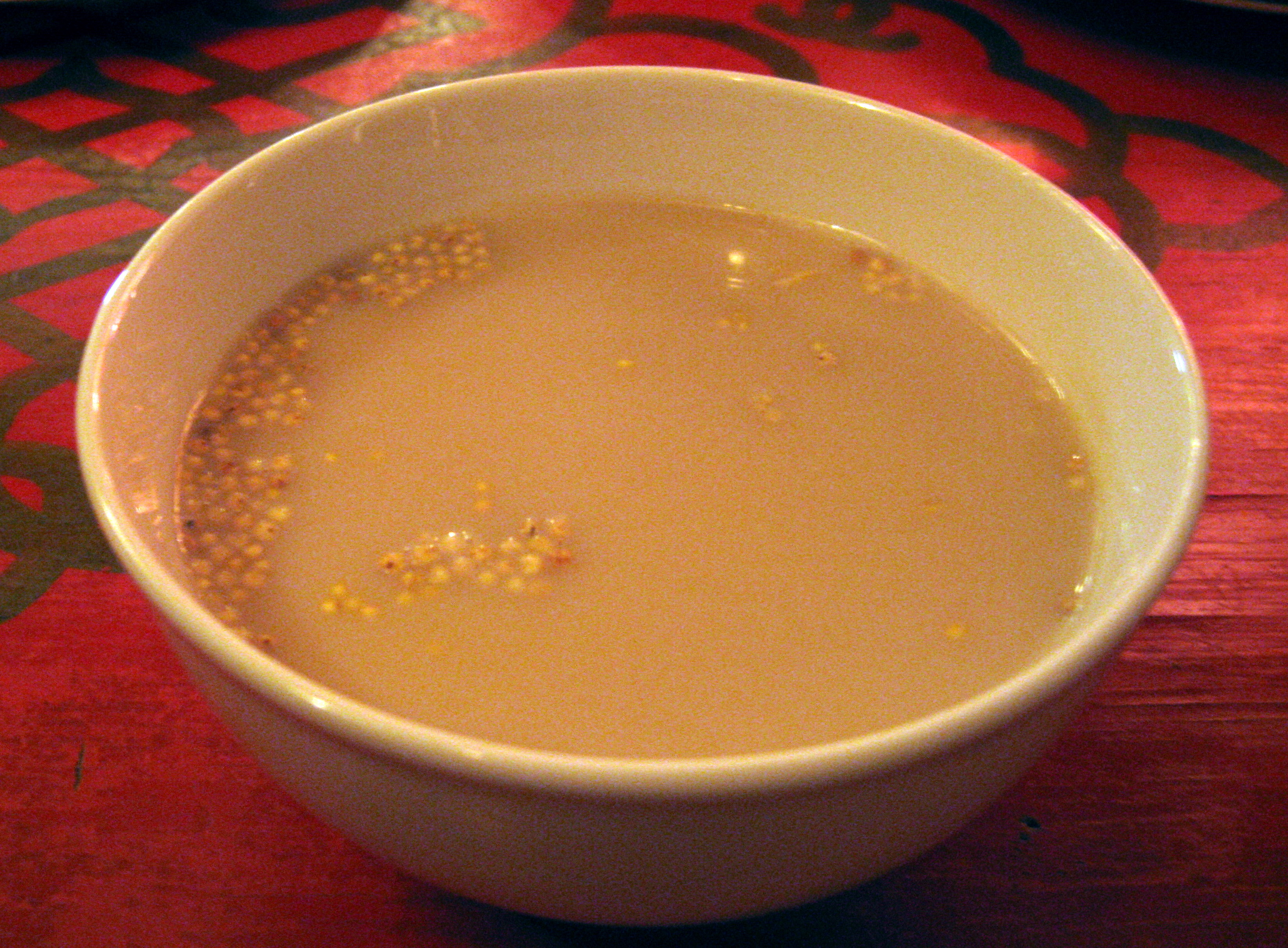
- A bowl of suutei tsai
- Alternative names: Mongolian milk tea
- Course: Drink
- Place of origin: Mongolia
- Region or state: East Asia
- Main ingredients: tea, milk, millet, salt

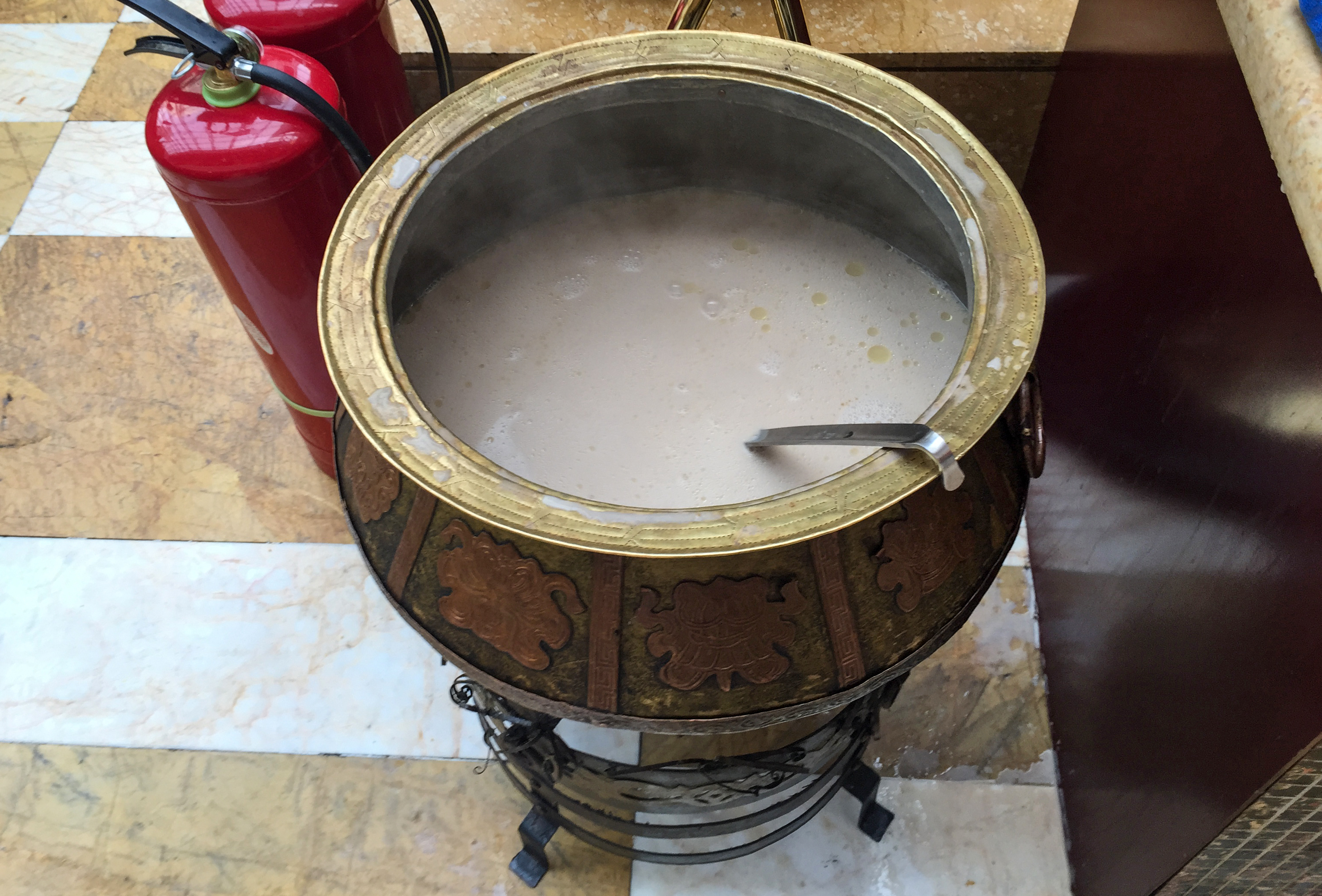
Suutei tsai

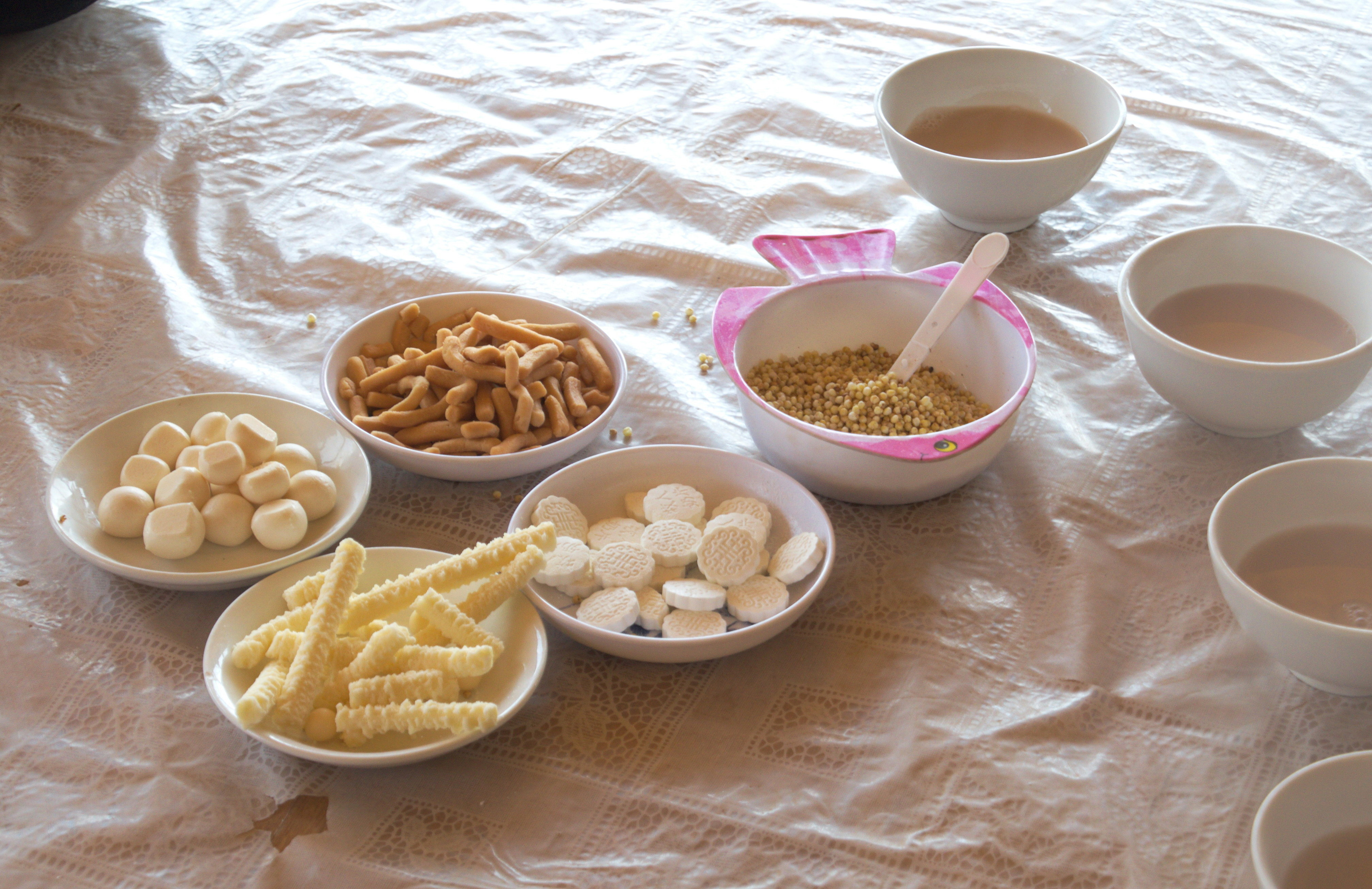
Süütei tsai (right) with toasted millet (middle) for adding to the tea and aaruul candies (left) as accompaniment

Suutei tsai (Mongolian: сүүтэй цай (Cyrillic) ᠰᠦ᠋ ᠲᠡᠢ
ᠴᠠᠢ(Mongolian script) [ˈsuːtʰeː ˈt͡sʰɛː] (IPA)) is a traditional Mongolian beverage made from tea, milk, millet and salt.

The drink is also known as süütei tsai, tsutai tsai, salt tea, or Mongolian salty tea.

== Preparation ==
The ingredients to suutei tsai are typically water, milk, tea leaves and salt. A simple recipe might call for one quart of water, one quart of milk, a tablespoon of green tea, and one teaspoon of salt. However the ingredients often vary. Some recipes use green tea while others use black tea. Some recipes even include butter or fat. Milk in Mongolia is typically fresh, whole milk, and using half milk and half cream instead of only processed milk produces a rich beverage close to the authentic. The amount of salt in the tea is often varied. Another common addition to suutei tsai is fried millet.

Occasionally, tail fat is added to increase richness and flavor.

The way of preparing the drink can also vary. The traditional way of cooking it includes stirring it by scooping it up while it is boiling and pouring it back in from a height. However, many today omit this step.

The tea that the Mongolians use for suutei tsai commonly comes from a block. The block consists of a lower quality of tea that is made up of stems or inferior tea leaves and is compressed into a block that can be easily stored. When needed, the tea is chipped off and added to the suutei tsai.

== History ==
Milk continues to be a very important part of the Mongolian diet. The milk that Mongolians drink comes from many sources including cattle, camels, horses, yaks, goats, and sheep, though milk from cattle is now the norm. An old tradition among many Mongols was to not drink water straight. This could have been a result of the Mongols' belief that water was sacred.

During the mid-thirteenth century, a Franciscan friar, William of Rubruck, set out to the Mongol Empire to make an account of the Mongols. In his account, Rubruck noted the Mongols' drinking habits with water, saying that the Mongols were "most careful not to drink pure water". In a land where juice and wine were not readily available, many Mongols opted to drink milk-based products like suutei tsai or airag (a type of milk alcohol made from fermented mares milk) instead of pure water.

== Popularity ==
While many Mongolians enjoy suutei tsai, some foreigners have a hard time adjusting to its distinctive flavor. This is particularly because of the salt in the drink.

Suutei tsai is one of the most common drinks in Mongolia. It is often drunk at meals and throughout the day. It is usually served to guests when they arrive at a Mongolian home, known as a yurt or ger. Upon arriving, guests are usually served suutei tsai with a hospitality bowl filled with snacks. Suutei tsai can be drunk straight, with boortsog (Mongolian fried biscuit) or with buuz (Mongolian dumplings).

In addition, suutei tsai is available in instant packet form.

== See also ==
- Mongolian cuisine
- Butter tea
- Kumis
- Masala chai
