= Boodog =

Mongolian barbecue dish

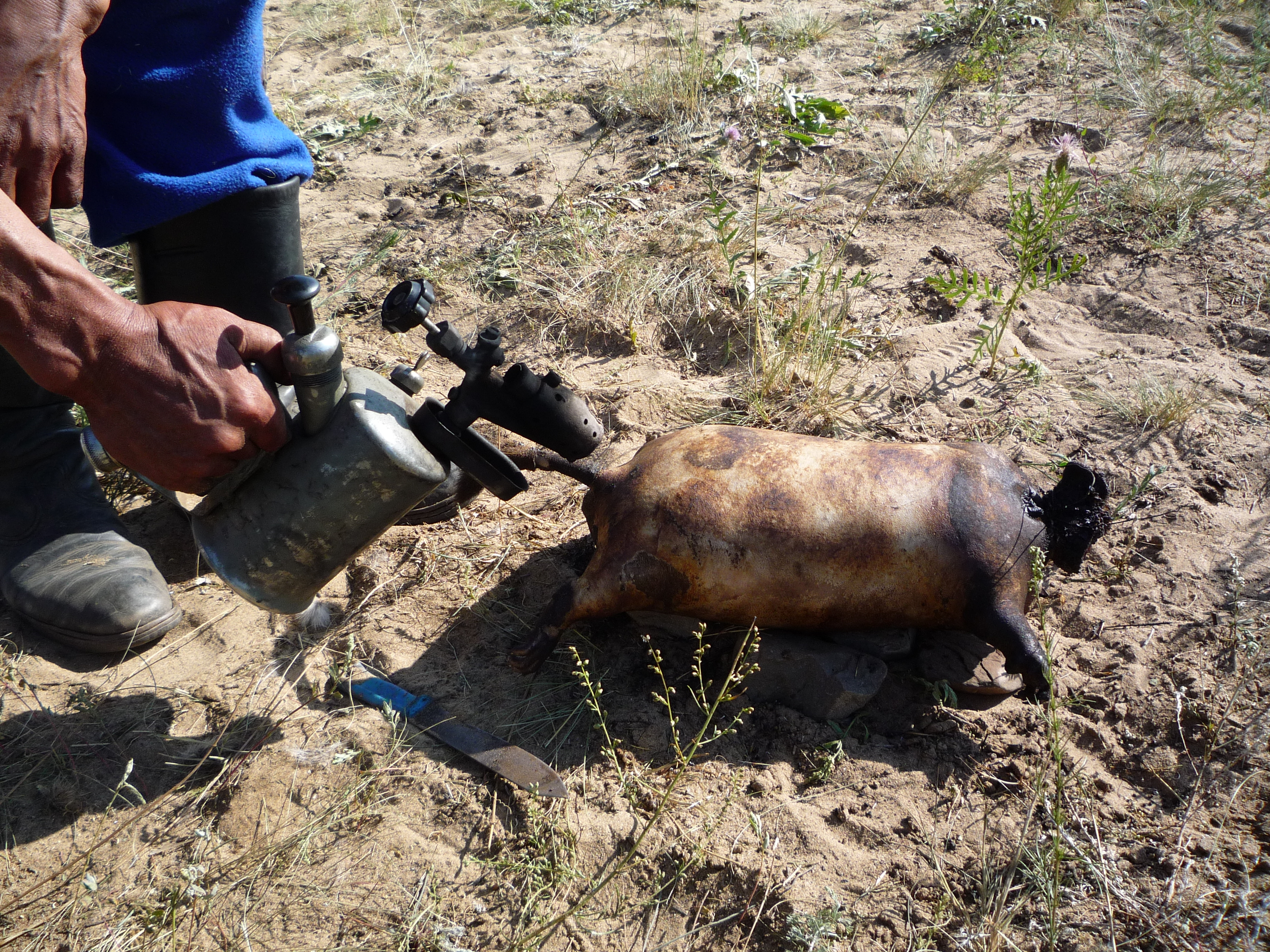
- Place of origin: Mongolia
- Main ingredients: Goat or marmot

How to make boodog

Boodog (Mongolian: боодог; Mongolian pronunciation: [pɔːtɔk]) is a Mongolian cuisine dish of barbecued goat, mutton or Tarbagan marmot cooked with heated stones inserted into the carcass. It is prepared on special occasions. The meat, often accompanied by vegetables, is cooked with heated stones in the de-boned body of the animals, or in the case of khorkhog, a sealed milk can. Marmot hunting usually takes place in the fall when the animals are larger and have been preparing for hibernation.

Boodog is considered a more egalitarian dish, with meat separated from the bones. Prepared in a perishable container, it is socially less prestigious and generally reserved for household members or fellow camp dwellers.

== Preparation ==
The practice is performed outdoors and requires two or more people. The animal is stunned and then killed by severing the aorta at the neck. Blood is drained into a container, as it must not touch the ground. The skin is kept intact except for a slit at the neck. The bones and viscera are removed through this opening, except for the bones in the feet. Heated stones, along with onion, salt, and some meat, are inserted into the body cavity. The neck is repeatedly squeezed and the body pressed to ensure the contents make contact with the hot stones. The neck is then closed with a wire, and the carcass is singed to remove hair, traditionally over embers, now more commonly with a gas burner.

The meat is cooked entirely through contact with the heated stones. Once done, the body is washed and the skin slit open to access the cooked meat. Unlike the customary method butchered and boiled, goats prepared as boodog are cooked whole, skin-on, and bone-separated.

== See also ==
- Regional variations of barbecue
