= Khuushuur =

Mongolian fried meat pastry or dumpling

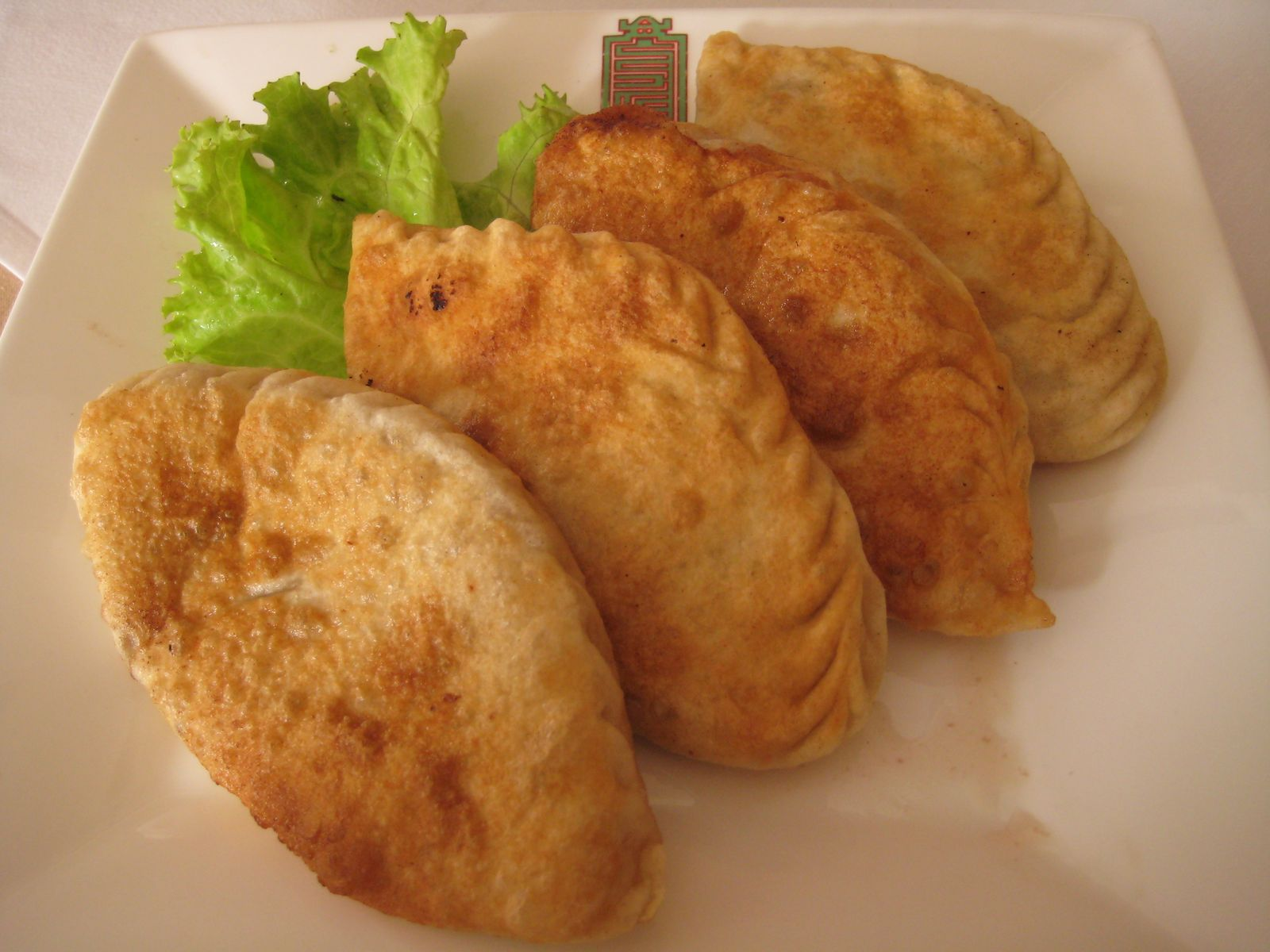
- Type: Dumpling
- Place of origin: Mongolia
- Main ingredients: Dough, meat (beef or mutton), onions or garlic, salt

Khuushuur (/ˈkuːʃʊər/; Mongolian: хуушуур [χʊ́ːʃʊˑr̥]) is a traditional Mongolian fried meat pastry. It consists of a circle of wheat flour dough folded in half around a filling of minced or ground mutton, sometimes beef, and pan- or deep-fried. The meat is seasoned with onion and salt; some cooks also add garlic and pepper. Versions containing potatoes, carrots, or cabbage are less common.

== History ==
Historically, khuushuur and related dumplings such as buuz and bansh are considered localized adaptations of Chinese dumplings. Wheat was not traditionally grown in Mongolia due to the nomadic lifestyle, but the influence of Chinese cuisine introduced dumpling-like preparations that became part of Mongolian food culture. The Mongolian name khuushuur comes from the Chinese huǒshāoer (火烧儿), a type of shaobing.

Khuushuur is widely available across Mongolia. In urban areas, it is commonly found in restaurants, while in rural regions, it may be sold from roadside stands or private homes. It is also a popular home-cooked dish. The dish is commonly associated with Naadam, Mongolia’s summer festival.

== Preparation ==
To make khuushuur, wheat flour and water are combined into a firm dough, kneaded briefly, then chilled. The filling consists of fatty lamb or mutton mince mixed with finely diced onion, chopped garlic, salt, ground black pepper, and optionally caraway seeds. The chilled dough is divided into small portions, each rolled into a 10 cm diameter circle. A small quantity of the meat mixture is placed in the center, and the dough is folded over and sealed, crimping the edge. The pastries are deep-fried, then baked briefly in the oven.

Khuushuur may be accompanied by lettuce, gherkins, or carrot salad. Condiments such as ketchup, Maggi sauce, or mayonnaise are sometimes used.

Taste varies little among preparations, with differences mostly due to meat quality or cooking oil. Vegetarian variants often carry a strong flavor of mutton due to the shared cooking oil. The dish generally includes more fat in the meat mixture than is common in Western cooking.

== See also ==
- Buuz
