= Khorkhog =

Mongolian dish

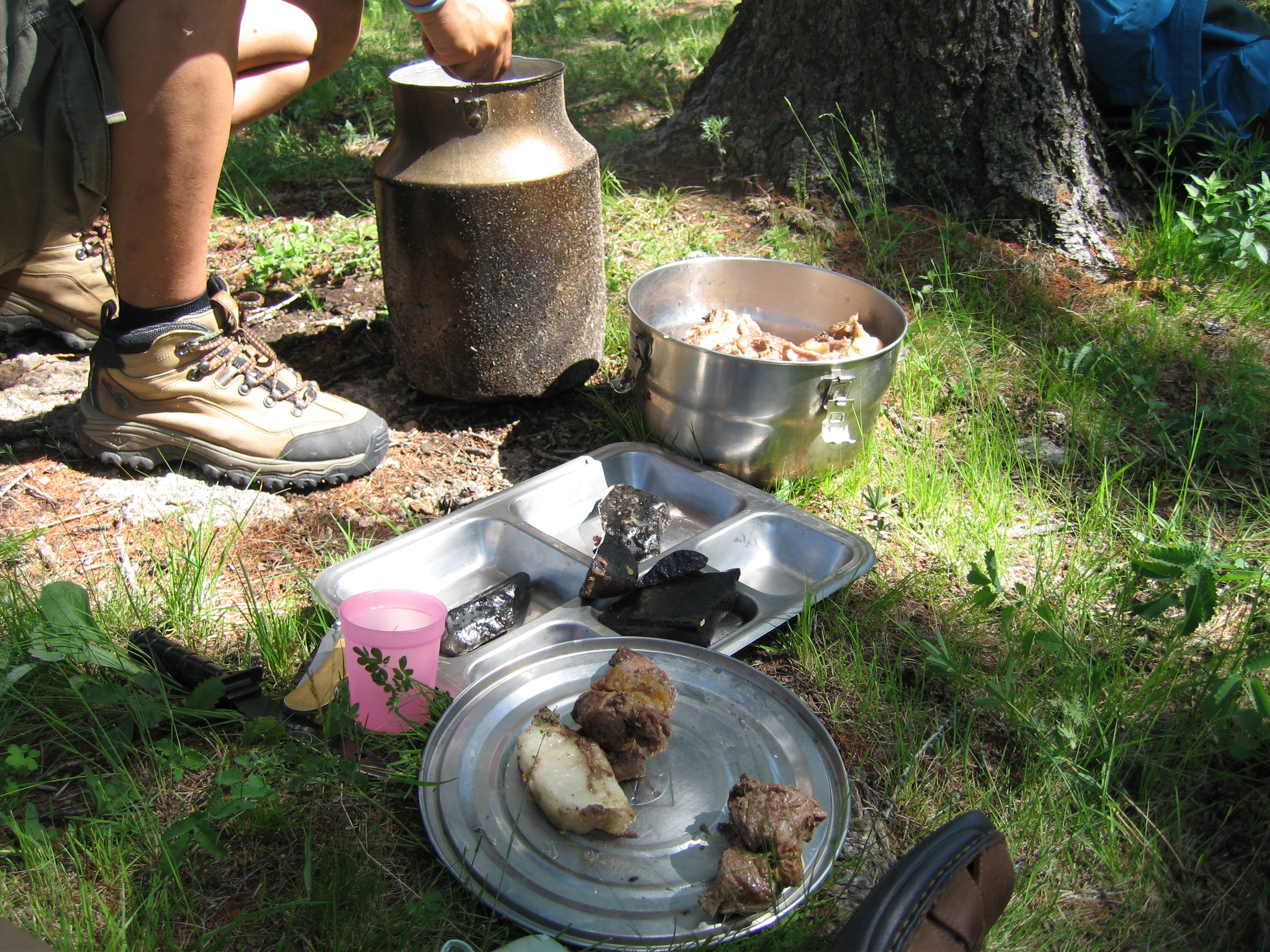
Khorkhog meal. Note the metal milk jug, the black stone, and the piece of boiled meat; the metal milk jug is where the cooking takes place.

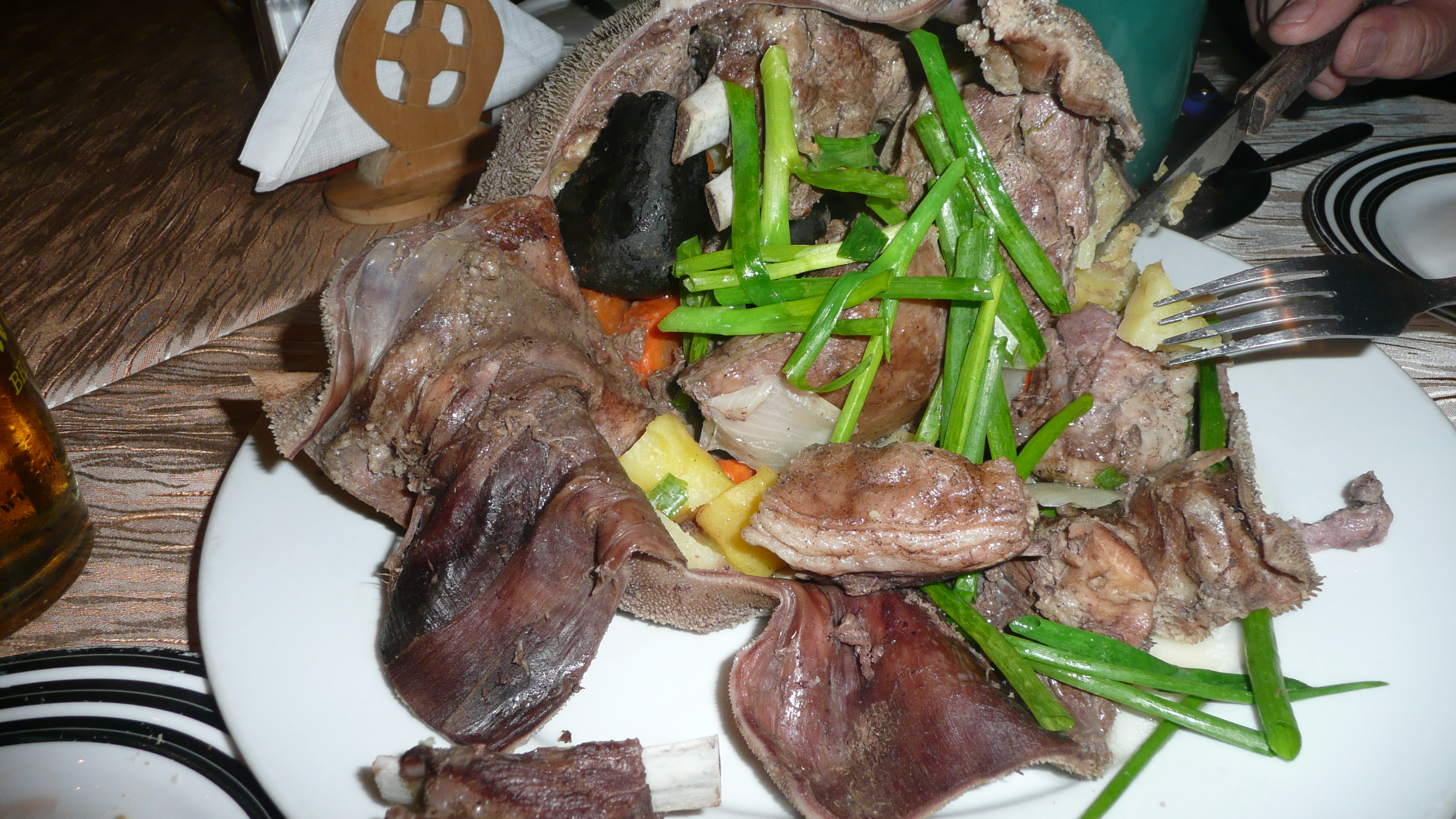
Khorkhog meal. Served in a restaurant in Ulaanbaatar

Khorkhog (Mongolian: Xopxoг) is a barbecue dish in Mongolian cuisine. Khorkhog is made by cooking pieces of meat inside a container which also contains hot stones and water, and is often also heated from the outside.

Khorkhog is said to be a relatively modern variation of boodog, dating back to the time of the Soviet Union's military presence in Mongolia, when Mongolians began cooking with cast-off Red Army water jugs instead of the inside of an animal skin. Khorkhog is a popular dish in Mongolian cuisine.

== Preparation ==
To make khorkhog, Mongolians take mutton (goat meat can be substituted) and cut it into pieces of an appropriate size while leaving the bones attached. The cook then places ten to twenty fist-sized stones over a fire. When the stones are hot enough, the rocks and the meat are placed in the chosen cooking container. Metal milk jugs are a traditional and typical choice, although any container sturdy enough to hold the hot rocks will suffice.

The heat of the stones and the steam will cook the meat inside the jug. The cook can also put the jug on a fire or the stove if the stones are not hot enough. The stones will turn black from the heat and the fat they absorb from the lamb. The jug remains covered while the cook listens to and smells the meal to judge when it is ready. The stones can take up to an hour and a half to cook the meat sufficiently. When the dish is ready, the cook hands out portions of meat along with the hot stones, which are tossed from hand to hand and are said to have beneficial properties. Diners usually eat khorkhog with their fingers, although knives may be used to slice the meat off the bone.

== See also ==
- List of lamb dishes
- Mongolian cuisine
- Asado
