= Tsuivan =

Mongolian noodle dish with meat and vegetables

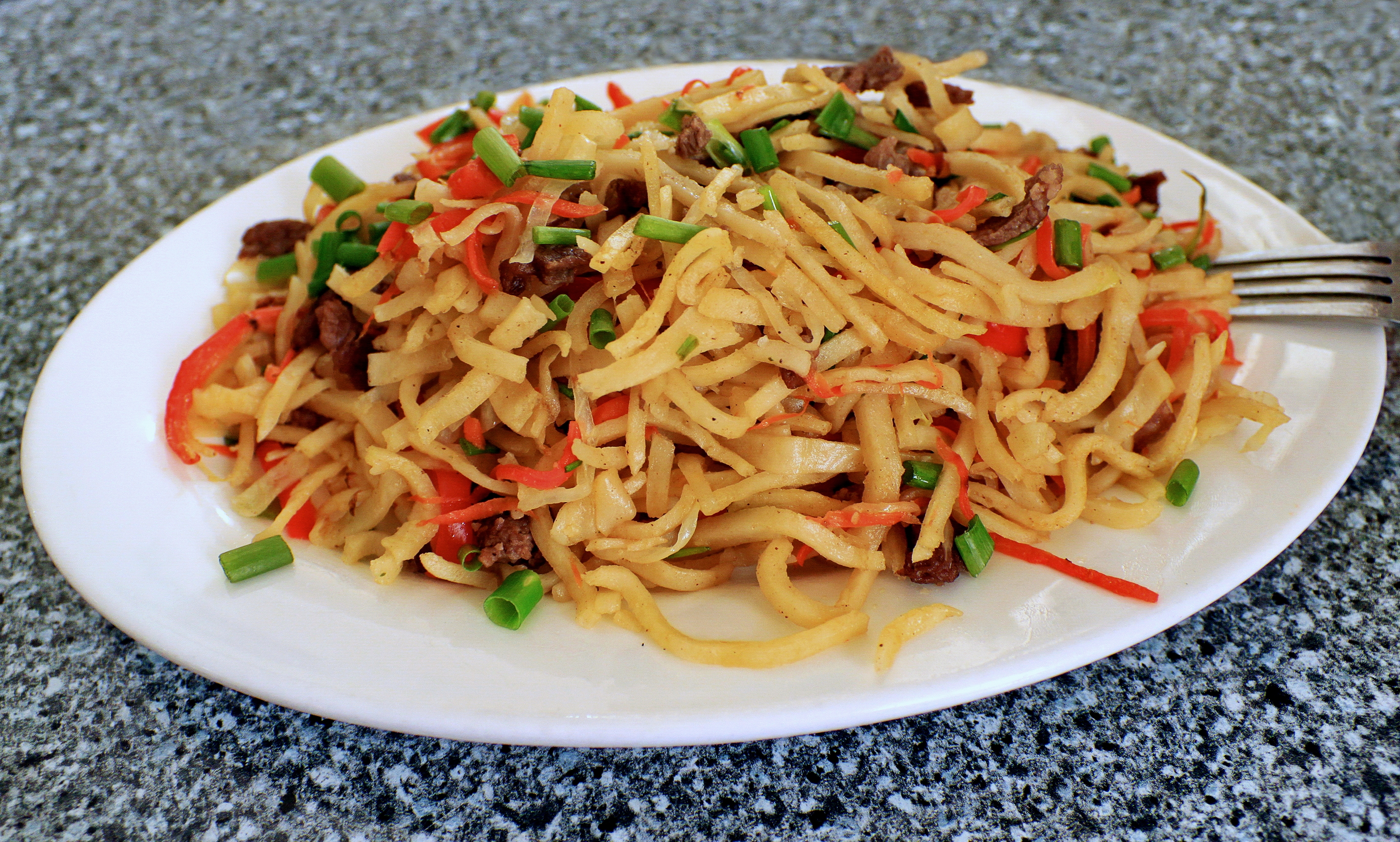
Tsuivan

Tsuivan (Mongolian: Цуйван) is a Mongolian handmade white butter noodle dish with meat and vegetables. It is one of Mongolia's most popular dishes.

== Etymology ==
The word tsuivan derives from the Chinese 炒餅 (chǎobǐng), literally "fried shredded pancake"
