= Hu Sihui =

14th-century Chinese therapist and dietician

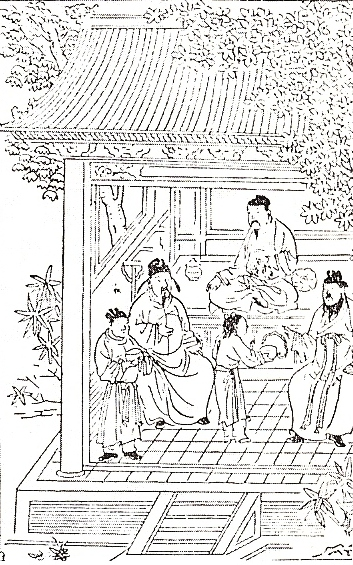
Illustration of Hu Sihui providing dietary counselling

Hu Sihui (Chinese: 忽思慧, 和斯輝, 忽斯慧, also Hu Zheng Qi Huei; active nr. 1314–1330) was a Chinese court therapist and dietitian during Yuan dynasty. He is known for his book Yinshan zhengyao (Dietary Principles), that became a classic in Chinese medicine and Chinese cuisine. He was the first to empirically discover and clearly describe deficiency diseases.

== Biography ==
The career of Hu Sihui, as he states in preface to his book, was in the reign of Buyantu Khan in Yenyu years (1314—1320). His ethnicity is unclear. He has been credited as of Mongol descent by some East Asian scholars, while Western scholars have pointed out his Turkic descent, his book being "far too comfortable with Turkic and a larger Islamic culture." He was an official in Xuanhui Yuan (the Ministry of Court Supplies and Provisions), around 1315 Hu Sihui initially emerged as the therapist of Empress Dowager, soon also became the therapist of the acting Empress, and later received the rank of the chief Imperial therapist and became responsible for dietary planning of the numerous members of the Emperor's family.

As tradition has it, Buyantu Khan, after several years of expeditions and irregular life, was overstrained and suffered acute pain in his kidneys. The vegetable soup prescribed by Hu Sihui cured the pains in 3 months, and one of Emperor's spouses became pregnant. The Emperor grandly awarded Hu Sihui as the cause of this "double joy".

In 1330, Hu Sihui, no longer busy with the Emperor and his harem, completed and presented to the Court his book Yinshan zhengyao, summarising his experiences as court dietitian. The main idea of his work was that people preparing food for the Emperor are directly responsible for efficiency of the State, as a monarch may get sick from improper eating, and lose the ability to properly manage state affairs effectively.

== Legacy ==
Hu Sihui's book was widely accepted in Later Yuan, but won even wider influence after the fall of Yuan. Ming Dynasty, after occupying Beijing in 1368, started to combine Chinese cuisine from other regions with the cosmopolitan cuisine of Yuan court. Jingtai Emperor of Ming (ruled 1449—1457) personally wrote a preface to an edition of Yinshan zhengyao.

As a culinary encyclopedia, this book made some regional recipes accepted as a part of the national cuisine of the whole of China. For example, it is this book that contained a recipe for roast duck that could be a predecessor of the widely known Beijing duck.

== Bibliography ==
- Buell, Paul, E. N. Anderson, Hu-ssu-hui. A soup for the Qan. Chinese Dietary Medicine. Kegan Paul International, 2000. 715 pages. ISBN 978-0-7103-0583-1
- Husihui, Paul D. Buell, E. N. Anderson, et al., A Soup for the Qan Chinese Dietary Medicine of the Mongol Era as Seen in Hu Sihui's Yinshan Zhengyao: Introduction, Translation, Commentary, and Chinese Text (Leiden: Brill, 2nd rev. and expanded, 2010).
- Françoise Sabban, "Cuisine À La Cour De L'empereur De Chine: Les Aspects Culinaires Du Yinshan Zhengyao De Hu Sihui," Médiévales (1983): 32-56.
