= Buuz =

Type of Mongolian steamed meat dumpling

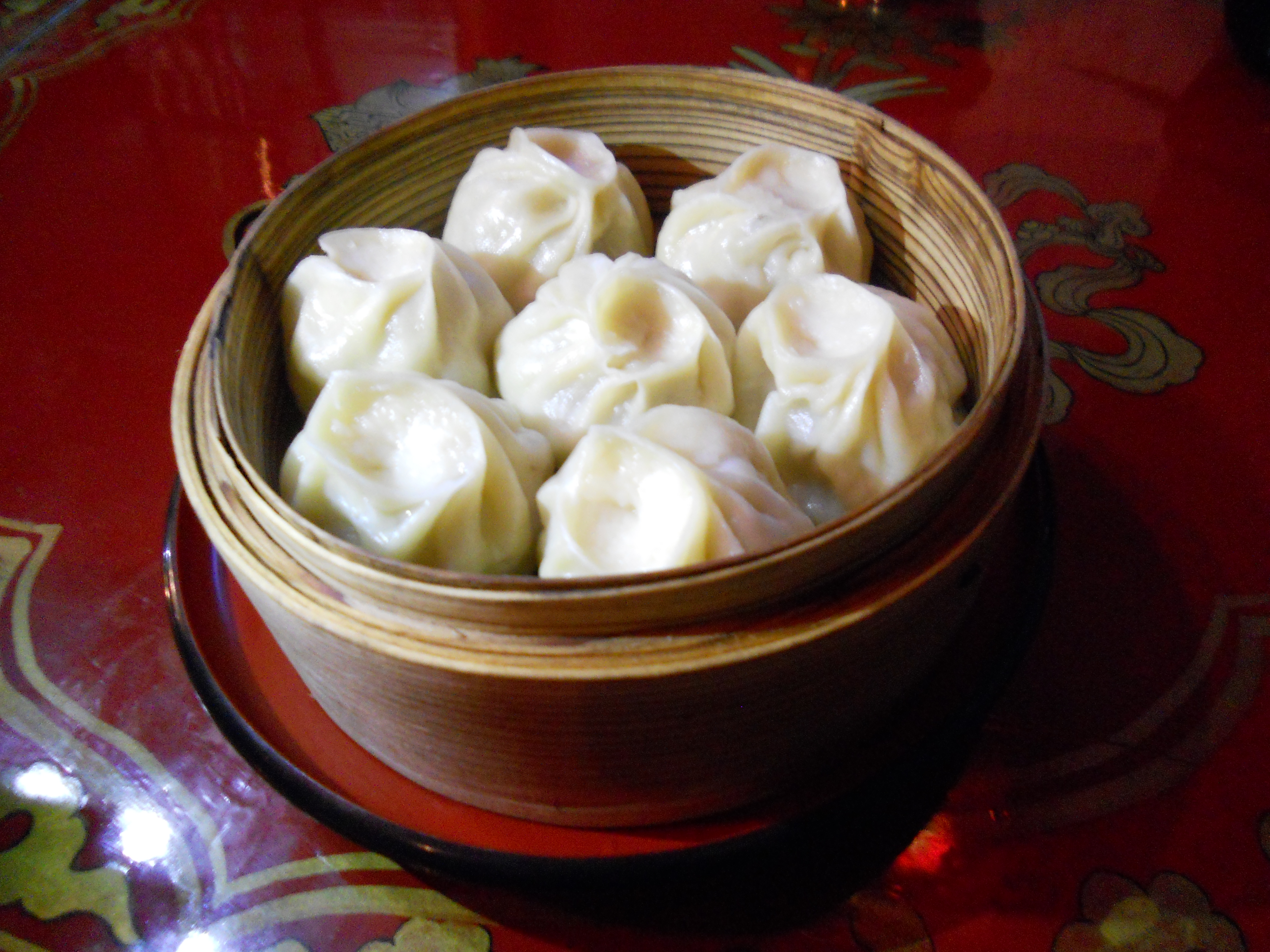
- Type: Dumpling
- Place of origin: Mongolia, Russia and China
- Region or state: Buryatia and Ewenki AB
- Main ingredients: Dough, mutton, or beef

Buuz (/ˈbuːz, ˈbuːts/; Mongolian: ᠪᠤᠤᠵᠠ (Бууз) [pʊ́ːts(ə)]; Buryat: Бууза ᠪᠤᠤᠽᠠ [ˈbʊː(d)z(ɐ)]) are a type of Mongolian steamed dumpling filled with meat. An example of authentic Mongolian and Buryatian cuisine, the dish is traditionally eaten at home during Tsagaan Sar, the Lunar New Year. In modern times it is also offered at restaurants and small cafes ("guanz") throughout the capital city of Ulaanbaatar, sometimes eaten with soy sauce.

== History and function ==
Buuz is the Mongolian version of the steamed dumpling which is commonly found throughout the region. Etymologically, it reveals its origin to China, as baozi (Chinese: 包子; pinyin: bāozi) is the Mandarin word for steamed dumpling. They are eaten in great quantities throughout the year but especially during the Mongolian New Year celebrations, which usually fall in February. Buuz are prepared in the weeks before and left outside to freeze; they are consumed with salads and fried bread, accompanied by suutei tsai (Mongolian tea) and vodka. Niislel salad (Mongolian: Нийслэл салат), a variant of Olivier potato salad, is particularly popular, being almost ubiquitous among banquets and formal meals in Mongolian households.

== Ingredients and preparation ==
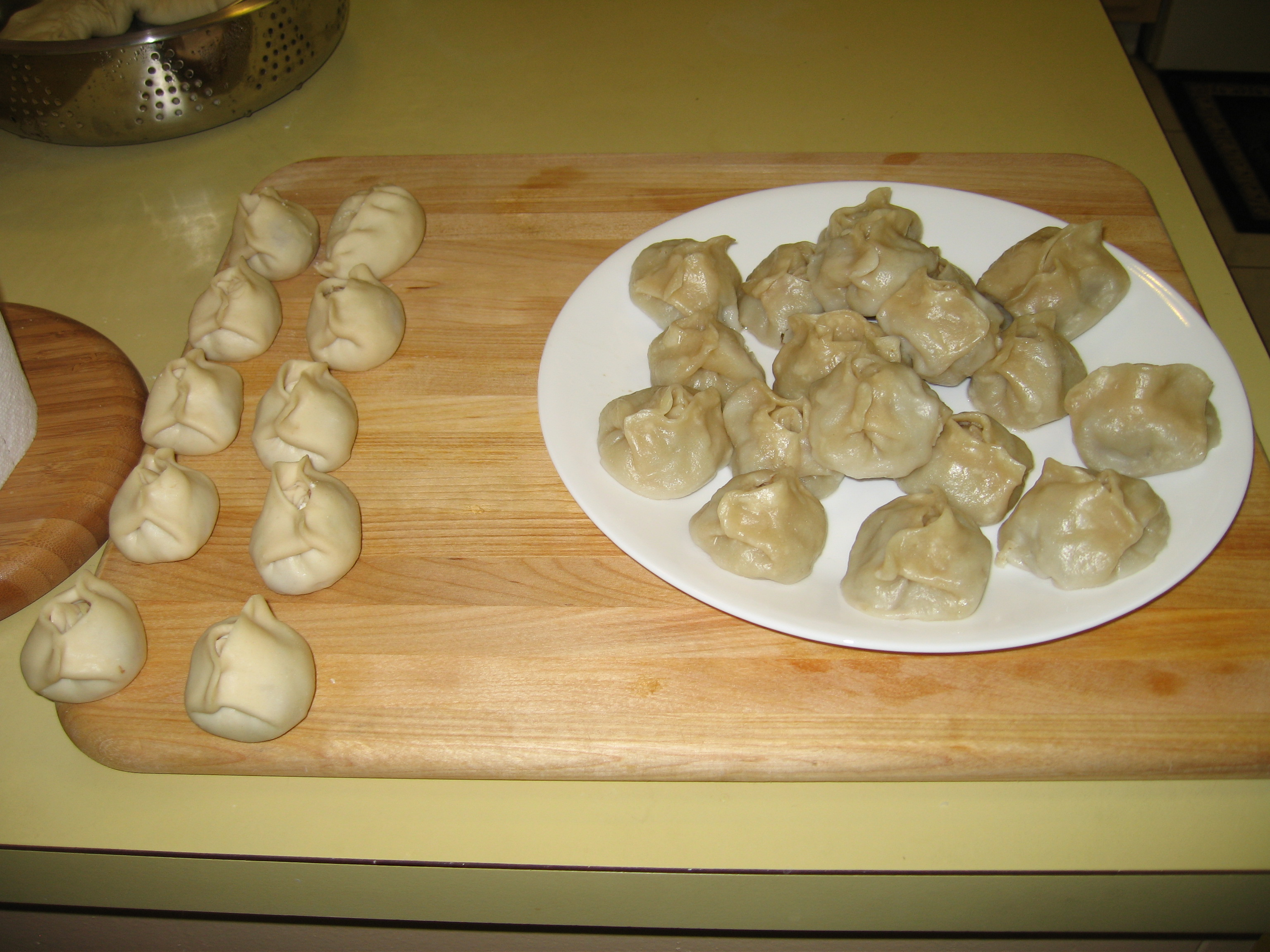
Uncooked and cooked buuz

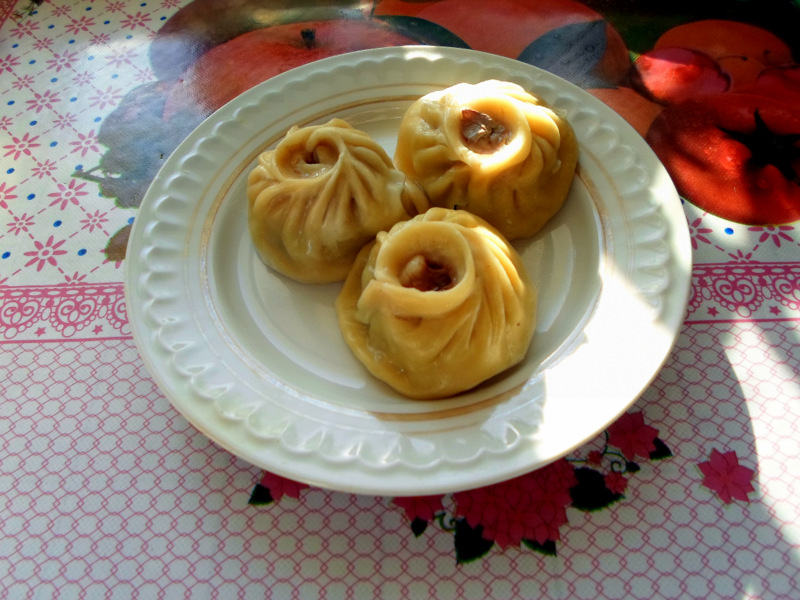
Buuz served in Buryatia

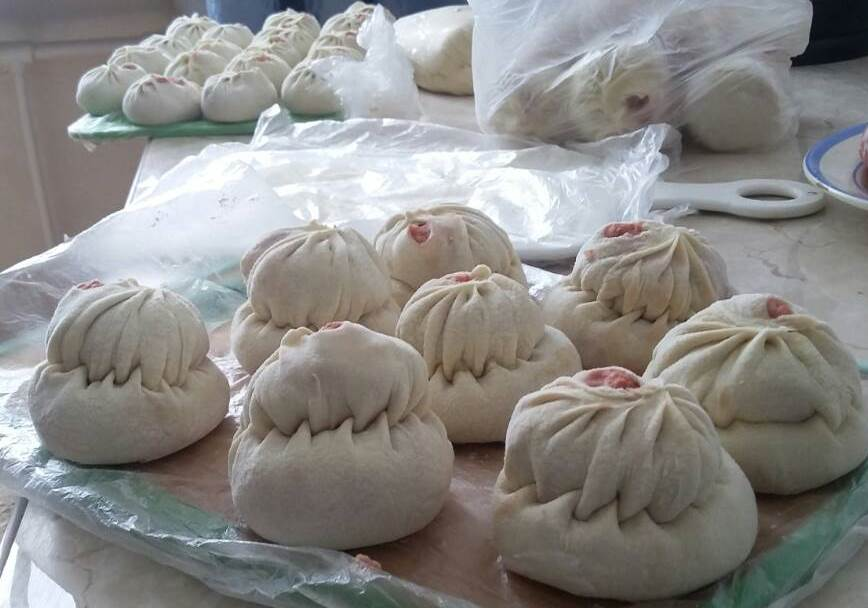
Double buuz, Buryatia

Buuz are filled with minced lamb and mutton or beef, which is flavored with caraway seeds. Onion and/or garlic are often added, and the dish is then salted. Occasionally, they are flavored with sprouted fennel seeds and other seasonal herbs. In more modern recipes, carrots, cabbages and various other vegetables and even rice are also common additions. Condiments such as soy sauce and Chinsu are occasionally added for further flavoring.

The meat ball is then placed inside a small pocket of dough which is folded around the ball with a small opening at the top to prevent bursting due to steam formation, in the chef's own personal style. The buuz is then steamed and eaten by hand, with the dough pocket catching the juices of the meat.

== See also ==
- Gürzə, the Azerbaijani equivalent
- Khinkali, the Georgian equivalent
- Gyoza, the Japanese equivalent
- Jiaozi and baozi, Chinese equivalents
- Mandu, the Korean version
- Mantı, the Turkic/Central Asian version
- Modak, the Indian equivalent
- Kozhukkattai, the Tamil equivalent
- Momo, Nepalese and Tibetan equivalent
- Pelmeni, the Russian equivalent
- Vareniki, the Ukrainian/Polish/Lithuanian equivalent
- List of steamed foods
