= Yinshan zhengyao =

Chinese cookbook and medical text

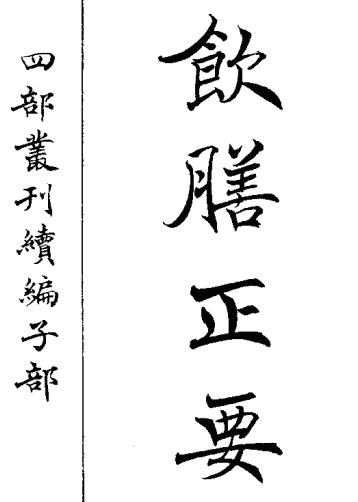
- Title page of the 1456 edition
- Author: Hu Sihui
- Original title: 飲膳正要
- Language: Chinese
- Publication date: 1330 (original manuscript); 1456 (Ming dynasty edition)
- Publication place: China (Yuan dynasty)
- Media type: Print
- OCLC: 1020904582

Yinshan zhengyao
- Traditional Chinese: 飲膳正要
- Simplified Chinese: 饮膳正要
Transcriptions
Standard Mandarin
- Hanyu Pinyin: Yǐnshàn zhèngyào

Yinshan zhengyao (Note: Translated into English as Proper and Essential Things for the Emperor's Food and Drink or Propriety and Essentials in Eating and Drinking.) is a Chinese cookbook and medical text written by Hu Sihui. It was first published in 1330, although the original manuscript is no longer extant; all modern editions of Yinshan zhengyao are based on the Ming dynasty edition published in 1456.

== Contents ==
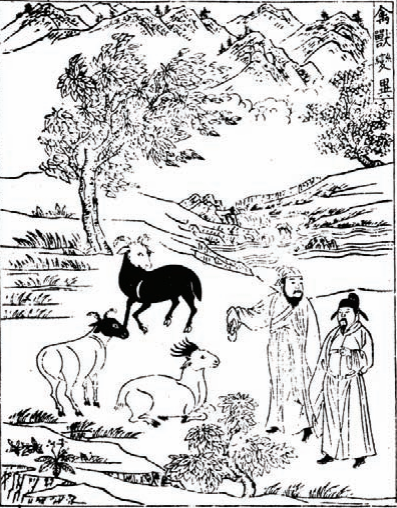
An illustration in Yinshan zhengyao, captioned "Strange transformations in animals" (禽獸變異)

Yinshan zhengyao comprises three juan (卷) or chapters. The first chapter is the shortest and includes biographies of the three mythical rulers Fuxi, Huangdi, and Shennong, alongside four advice columns on topics such as "Food Avoidances during Pregnancy" and "Things to Avoid and Shun when Drinking Liquor". The chapter ends with a list of 95 Middle Eastern recipes, titled "Strange Delicacies of Combined Flavours", almost half of which contain no explicit medicinal value. The dishes discussed range from broths to dumplings. Seventy-two of the recipes call for lamb, the meat of choice for the Mongols. The remaining recipes involve a wide range of meats, including bear, horse, turtle, and wolf, alongside beef, chicken, and pork.

The second chapter opens with a list of recipes for 57 beverages and liquid foods, titled "Various Hot Beverages and Concentrates", which concludes with a discussion of different types of water, from rain to spring water. The next part of the chapter details the extreme diets of various supercentenarians, as well as instructions on how to assemble a "heavenly pillow" that can reverse ageing. The chapter ends with a series of food-related medical discussions, including "Food Avoidance when Taking Medicines" and "Foods that Cure Various Illnesses".

The final chapter is modelled on Chinese bencao (pharmacopoeia). It lists various foods and their medicinal properties, including 46 vegetables, 39 fruits, 35 meats, 28 sea creatures, and 20 types of poultry. For instance, the reader is advised to eat tiger meat to ward off both tigers and illness-causing demons.

Written in Chinese, Yinshan zhengyao also contains several Arabic, Mongol, and Turkish loan words. In total, the text includes 236 recipes and more than two hundred drawings, some of which are followed by written explanations. One such drawing, found in the second juan, is captioned "strange transformations in animals" (禽獸變異) and depicts a trio of black-and-white coloured goats. The author explains that "if one is not careful about what one eats, it will result in one becoming ill." This is immediately accompanied by a list of animals that should not be consumed, such as a "white horse with green hooves", a "crab with only one claw", or a "sheep with a hole in its liver".

== Publication history ==
The text was written during the Yuan dynasty by Hu Sihui, about whom next to nothing is known, apart from the fact that he was first appointed as a court dietician sometime between 1314 and 1320.

According to the preface, written by Yu Ji, Yinshan zhengyao was a "culmination of efforts reaching back to Qubilai's time". It was first presented to the emperor, Jayaatu Khan Tugh Temür, "on the third day of the third month of the third year of Tianli (天曆)", or late spring 1330. The complete Yuan manuscript is now lost, and all modern editions are based on the Ming dynasty edition that was published in 1456.
