= Shenyang =

Capital of Liaoning, China

Shenyang 沈阳市
- Prefecture-level and sub-provincial city
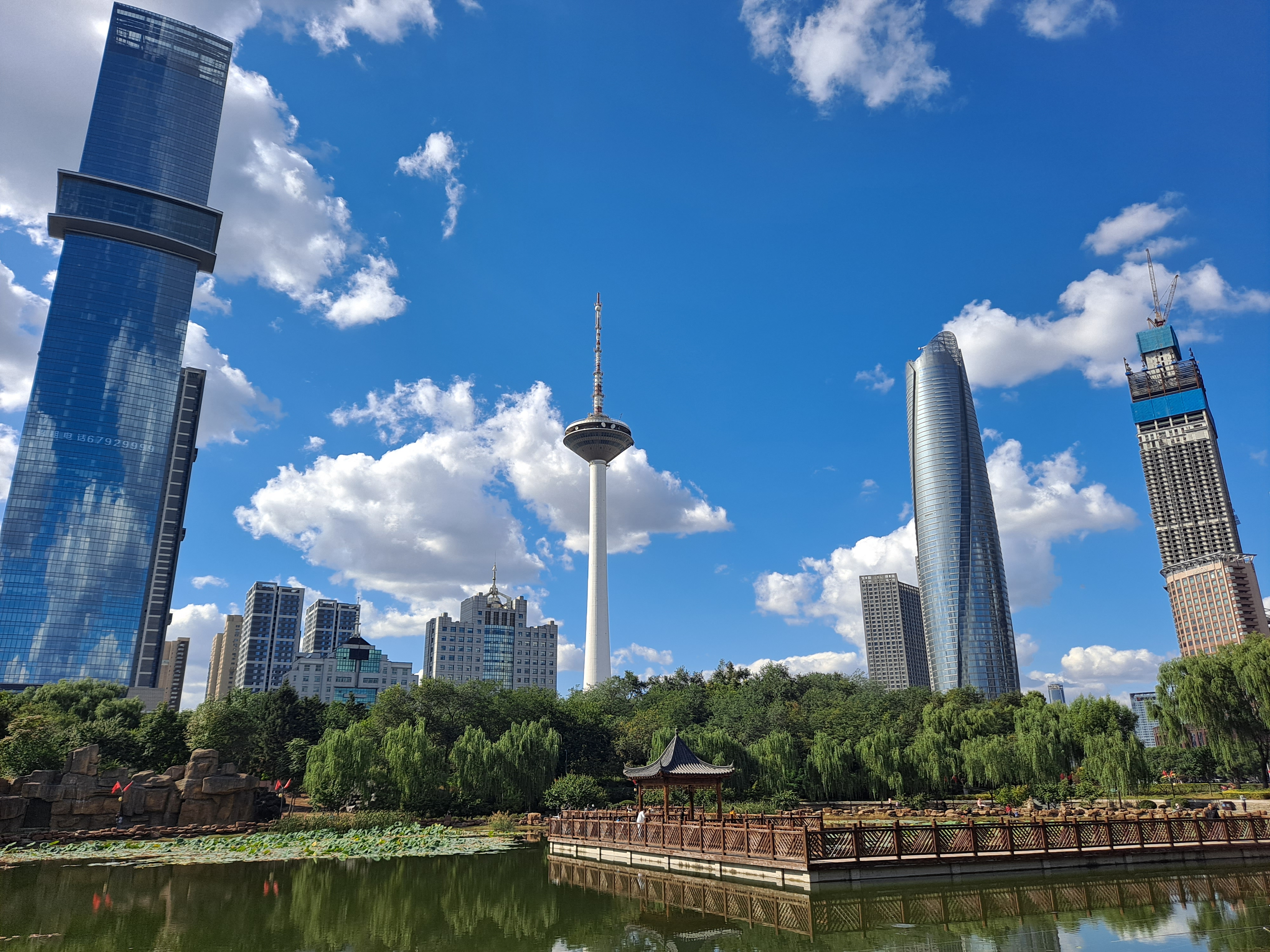
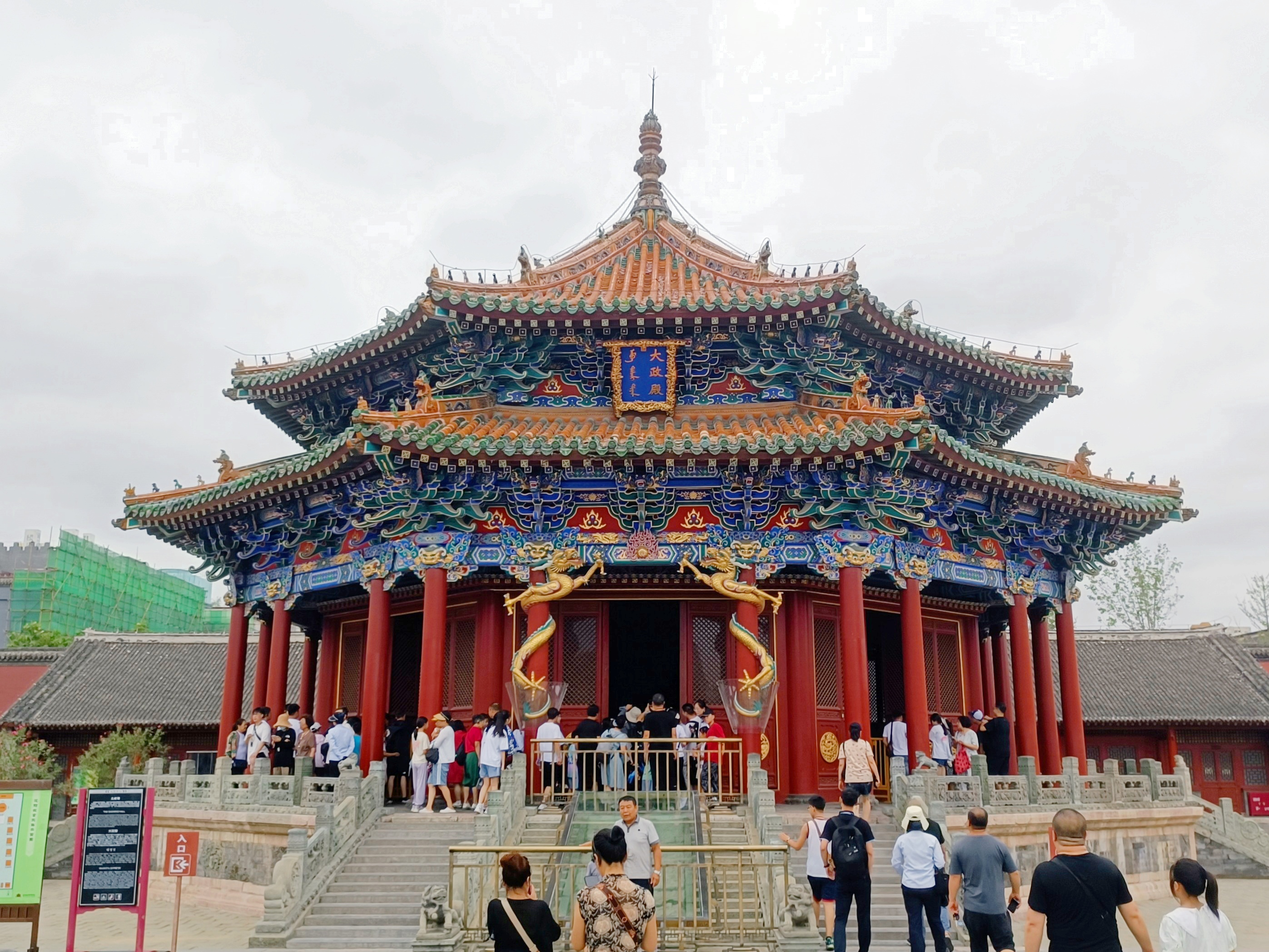
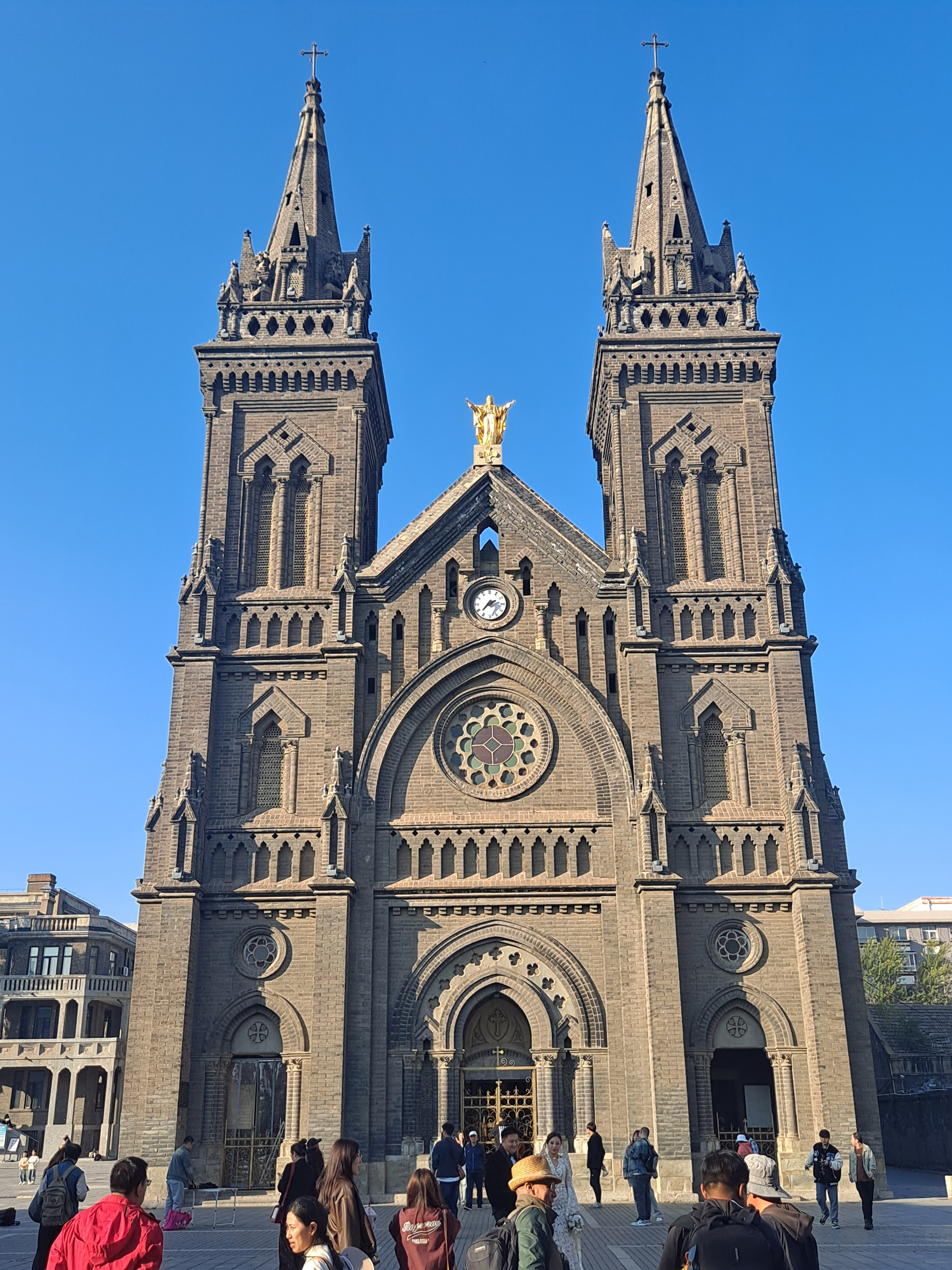
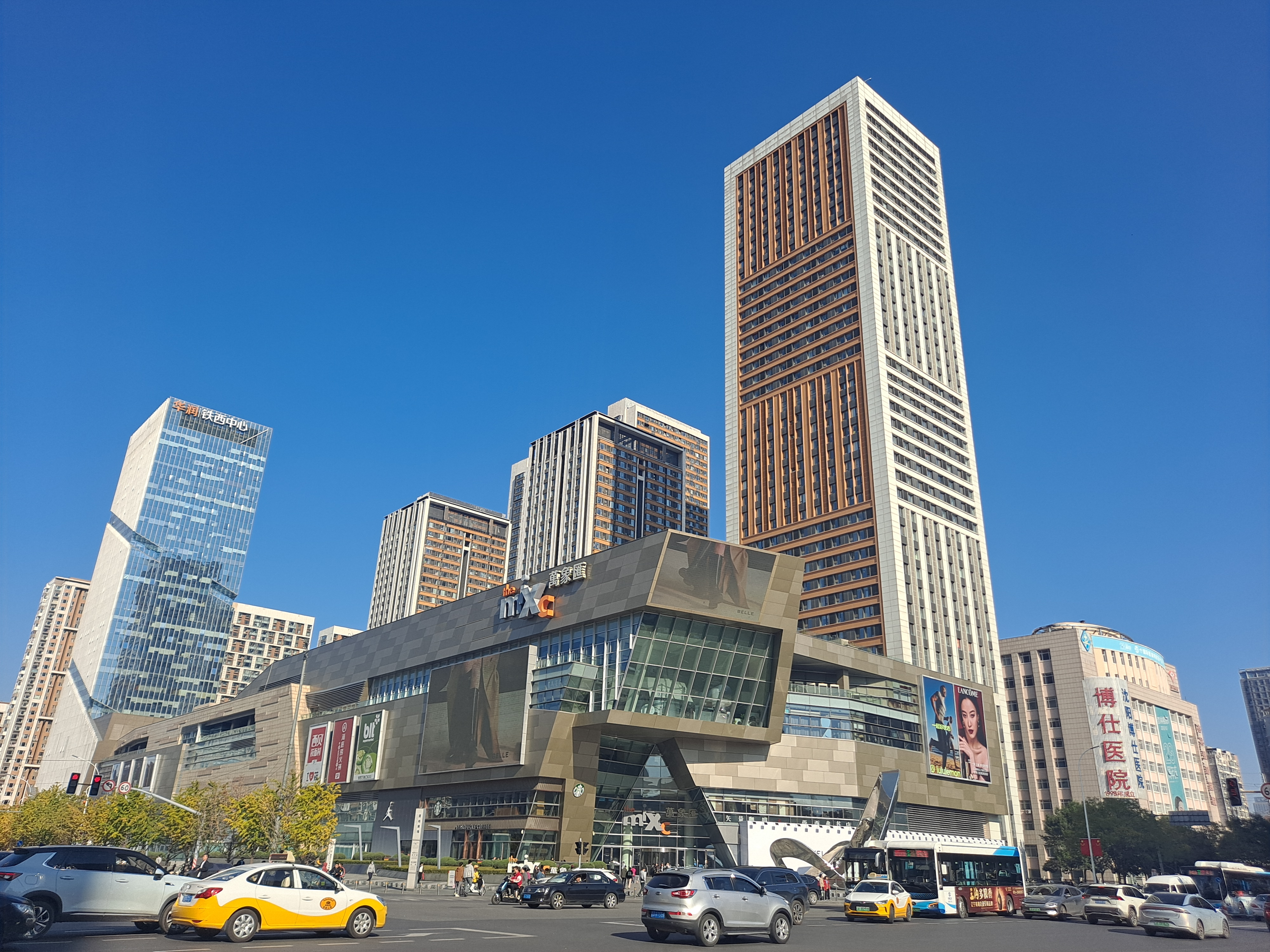
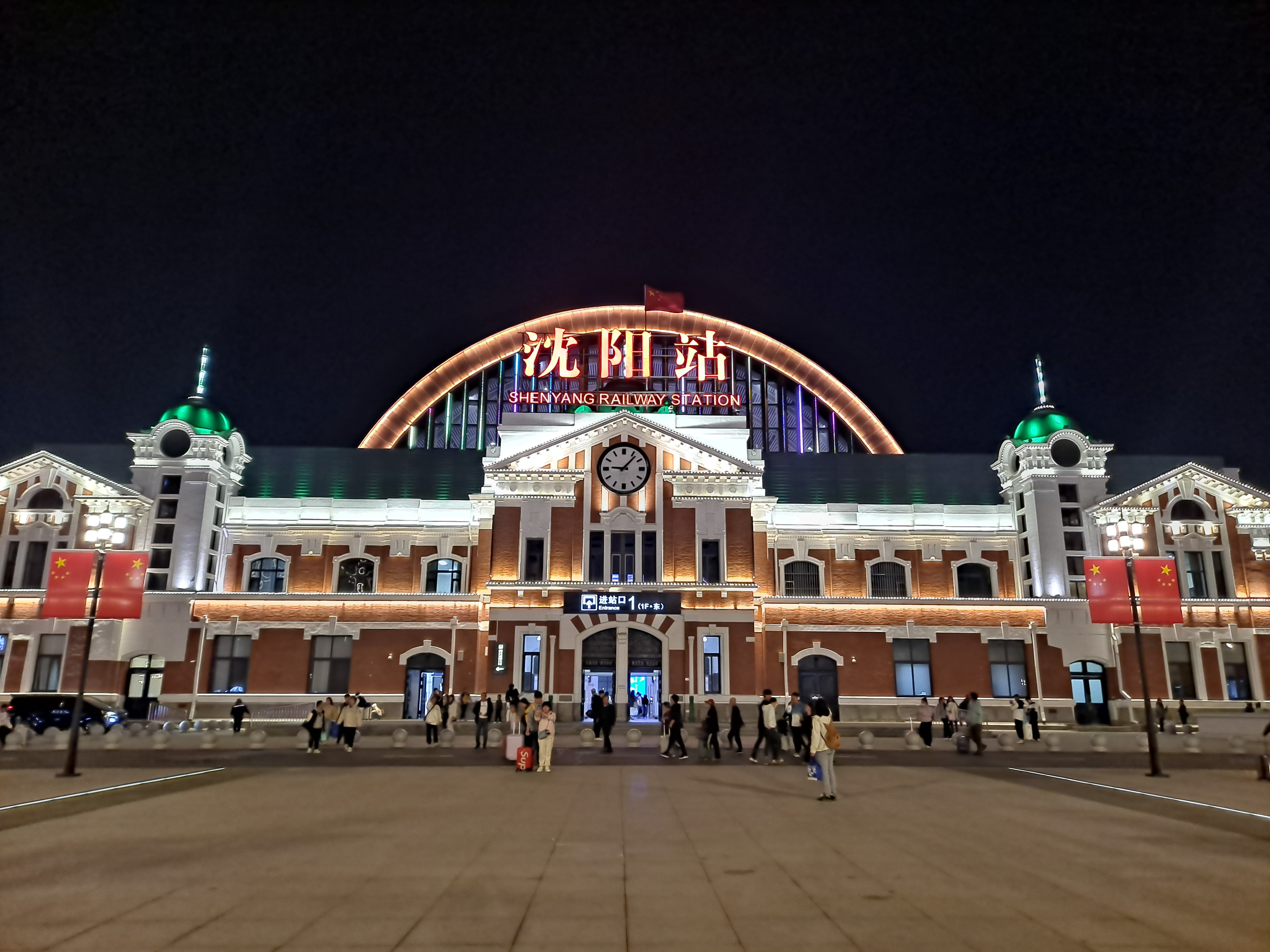
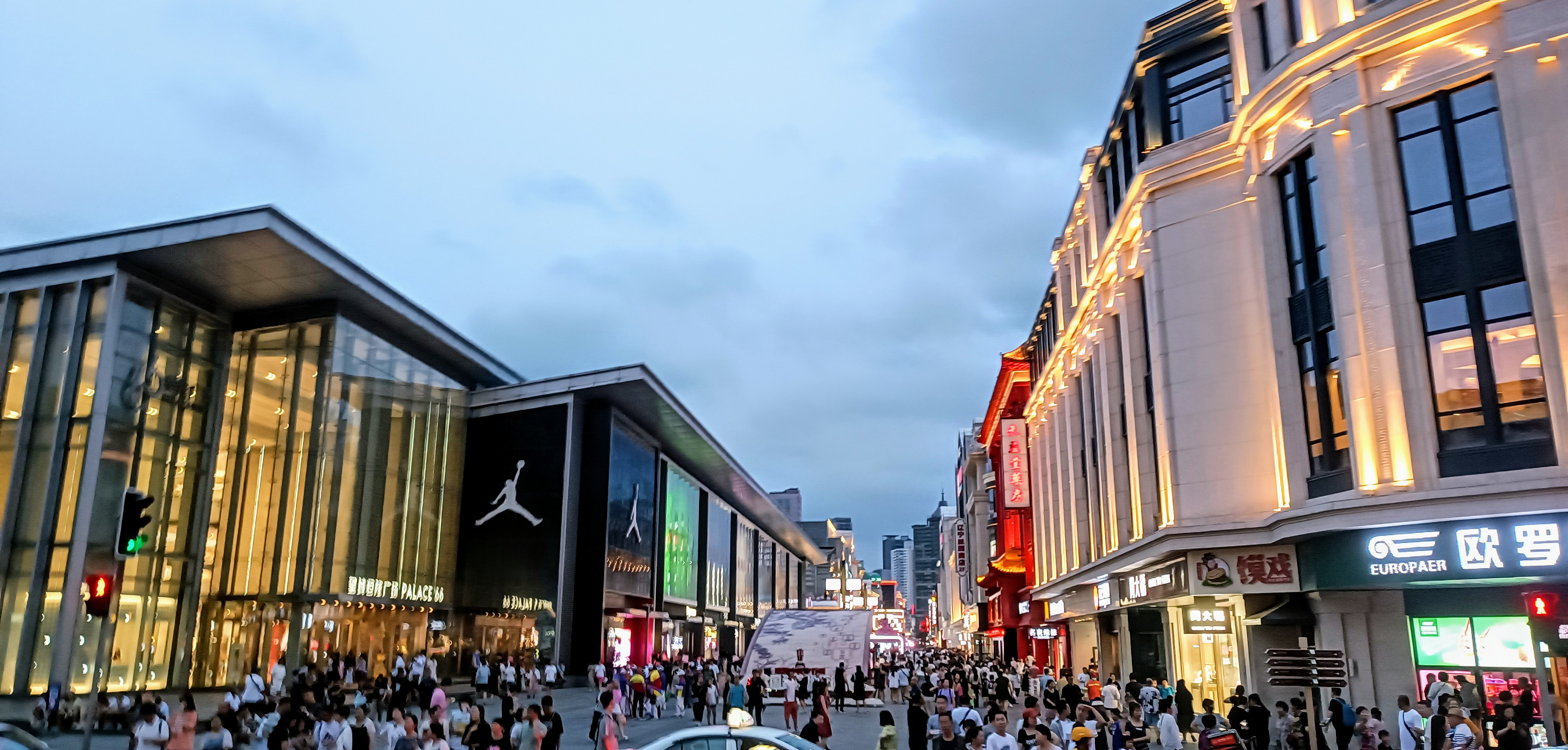
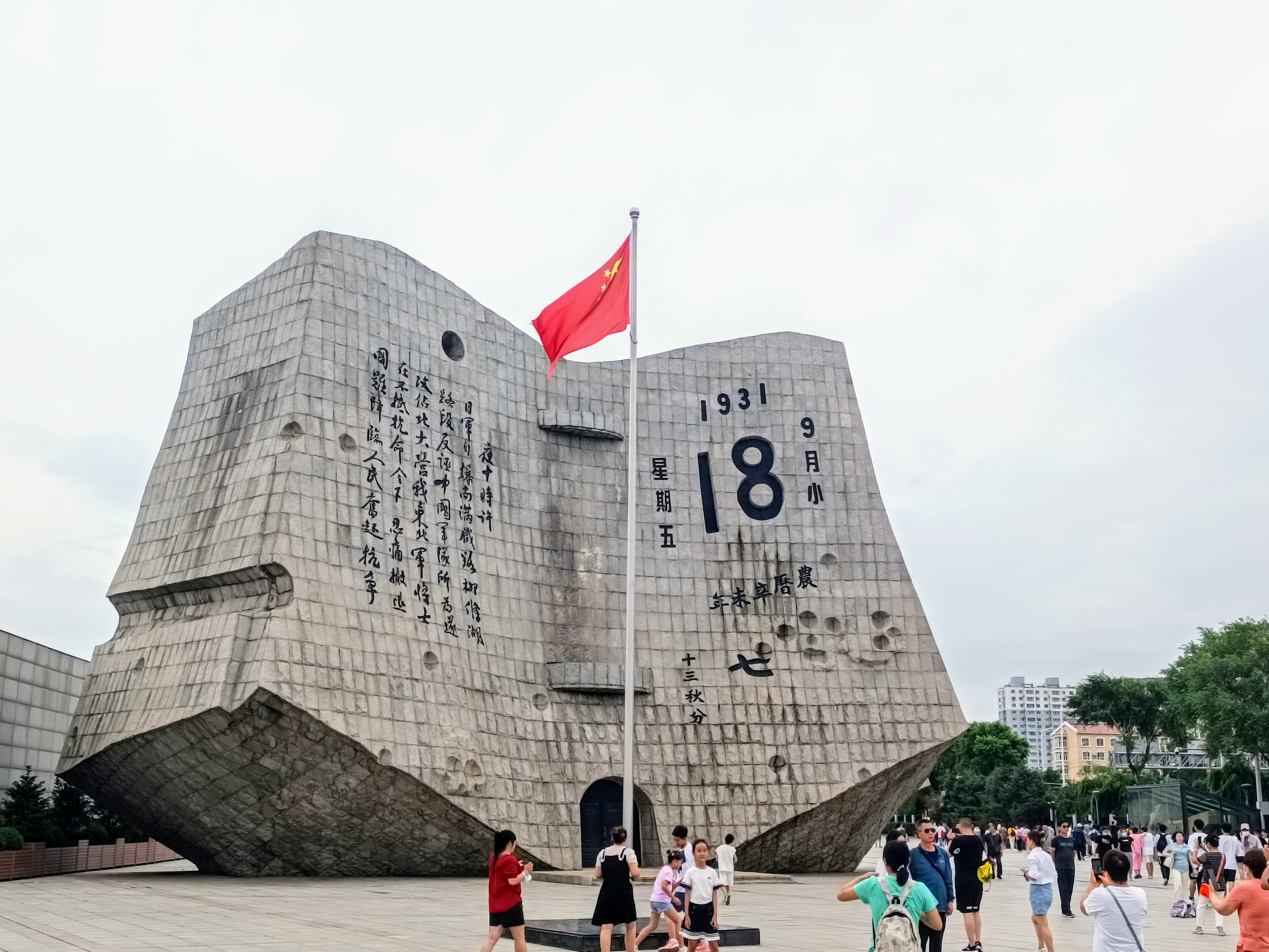
- Shenyang skyline Mukden Palace Sacred Heart of Jesus Cathedral Tiexi Guangchang Shenyang railway station Zhongjie 9.18 Historical Museum

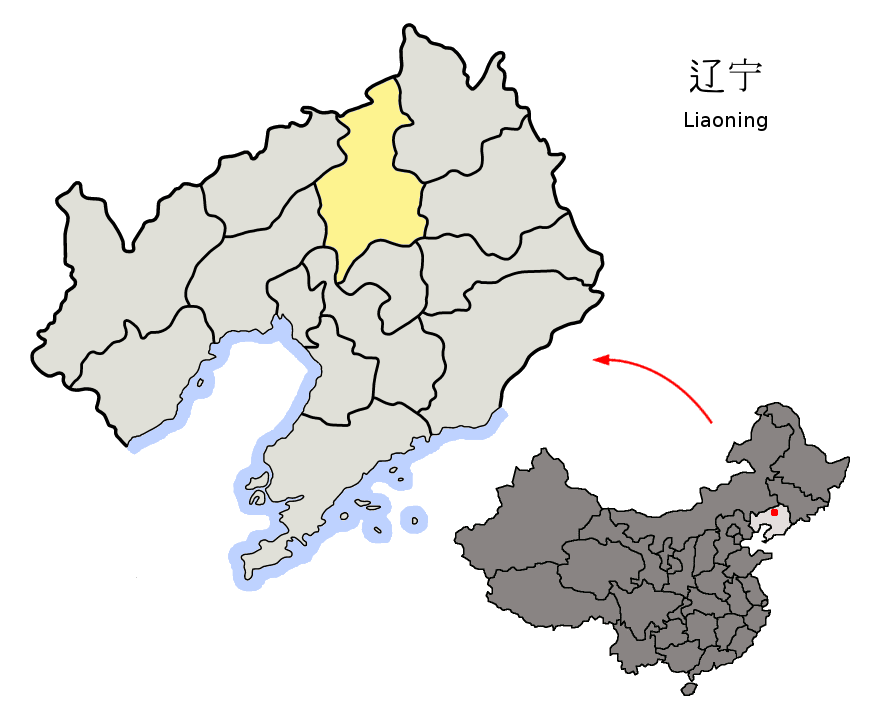
- Location of Shenyang within Liaoning

- Location of the city center within Liaoning Shenyang (Eastern China) Shenyang (China)
- Coordinates (Shenhe): 41°48′09″N 123°25′41″E
- Country: China
- Province: Liaoning
- Municipal seat: Hunnan District
- County-level divisions: 13

Government
  - Type: Sub-provincial city
  - Body: Shenyang Municipal People's Congress
  - CCP Secretary: Huo Bugang
  - Congress Chairman: Fan Jiying
  - Mayor: Ma Shanshan
  - CPPCC Chairman: Han Dongtai

Area
  - City: 12,869 km^{2} (4,969 sq mi)
  - Urban: 3,658.2 km^{2} (1,412.4 sq mi)
  - Metro: 4,222.2 km^{2} (1,630.2 sq mi)
- Elevation: 55 m (180 ft)

Population (2020)
  - City: 9,070,093
  - Density: 704.80/km^{2} (1,825.4/sq mi)
  - Urban: 7,885,142
  - Urban density: 2,155.5/km^{2} (5,582.6/sq mi)
  - Metro: 8,192,848
  - Metro density: 1,940.4/km^{2} (5,025.7/sq mi)

GDP
  - City: CN¥ 903 billion; US$ 127 billion
  - Per capita: CN¥ 99,527; US$ 13,975
- Time zone: UTC+8 (China Standard)
- Postal code: 110000
- Area code: 24
- ISO 3166 code: CN-LN-01
- License plate prefixes: 辽A
- Climate: Dwa
- Website: www.shenyang.gov.cn
- Symbols
- Flower: Rosa rugosa
- Tree: Pinus tabuliformis

Shenyang
- "Shenyang" in simplified (top) and traditional (bottom) Chinese characters

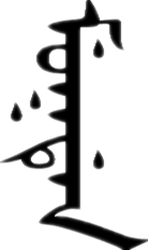
- "Mukden" in Manchu script

Chinese name
- Simplified Chinese: 沈阳
- Traditional Chinese: 瀋陽
- Hanyu Pinyin: Shěnyáng
- Literal meaning: north bank of the Shen River
Transcriptions
Standard Mandarin
- Hanyu Pinyin: Shěnyáng
- Bopomofo: ㄕㄣˇ ㄧㄤˊ
- Gwoyeu Romatzyh: Sheenyang
- Wade–Giles: Shên^{3}-yang^{2}
- Yale Romanization: ShěnYáng
- IPA: [ʂə̀n.jǎŋ]
Wu
- Romanization: Sen^{上}-yan^{平}
Yue: Cantonese
- Yale Romanization: Sám-yèuhng
- Jyutping: Sam2-joeng4
- IPA: [sɐm˧˥.jœŋ˩]
Southern Min
- Hokkien POJ: Sím-iông

Mukden
- Chinese: 盛京
- Hanyu Pinyin: Shèngjīng
- Postal: Mukden
- Literal meaning: Prosperous [capital]
Transcriptions
Standard Mandarin
- Hanyu Pinyin: Shèngjīng
- Yale Romanization: ShèngJīng

Manchu name
- Manchu script: ᠰᡳᠮᡳᠶᠠᠨ ᠮᡠᡴ᠋ᡩᡝᠨ
- Romanization: simiyan/mukden

Shenyang, (Note: Chinese: 沈阳; pinyin: Shěnyáng; /ʃɛnˈjæŋ/ shen-YANG; Mandarin pronunciation: [ʂə̀n.jǎŋ]; formerly known as Fengtian (Note: 奉天; Mandarin pronunciation: [fə̂ŋtʰjɛ́n])) formerly known by its Manchu name Mukden, (Note: IPA: [mukʰtən]) is a sub-provincial city in China and the provincial capital of Liaoning province. It is the province's most populous city with a population of 9,070,093 as of the 2020 census, also making it the largest city in Manchuria by urban population, and the second-largest by metropolitan population (behind Harbin). The Shenyang metropolitan area is one of the major megalopolises in China, with a population of over 23 million. The city's administrative region includes the ten metropolitan districts, the county-level city of Xinmin, and the counties of Kangping and Faku.

Shenyang has been controlled by numerous different states and peoples during its history. In the 14th century, the city came under the control of the Ming dynasty (1368–1644), for whom it served as an important military stronghold. The 1621 Battle of Shen-Liao resulted in Shenyang briefly serving as the capital of the Jurchen Later Jin dynasty, the direct predecessor of the Qing dynasty (1644–1912). The 1905 Battle of Mukden took place south of Shenyang as part of the Russo-Japanese War. The subsequent Japanese victory allowed its annexation of the region west of the old city and the increase of Japanese influence in Shenyang. In 1931, the Mukden incident led to the Japanese invasion and occupation of the rest of Manchuria, and the establishment of the puppet state of Manchukuo. After the Japanese surrender in 1945, Shenyang remained a stronghold of the Kuomintang until its capture by the Communists in 1948 following the Liaoshen campaign.

Together with its surrounding cities, Shenyang is an important industrial center in China, and serves as the transportation and commercial hub of China's northeast—particularly involved in links with Japan, Russia, and Korea. A center of heavy industry in China since the 1930s, and the spearhead of the Chinese central government's Northeast Area Revitalization Plan, the city has been diversified its industry in the 21st century, including expanding into the service sector. Growing industries include software, automotive and electronics. Shenyang is also a major city for scientific research and education in Manchuria. As of 2025, it was listed among the top 100 cities by scientific output in the world, as tracked by the Nature Index. The city is home to several major universities, notably Northeastern University and Liaoning University, listed as prestigious universities in the Double First-Class Construction.

== Name ==
Shenyang literally means "the yang side of the Shen River" and refers to the location of the Hun River (formerly called the Shen River, 瀋水; Shěn Shuǐ), on the southern side of the city. According to Chinese naming tradition, a river's north bank and a mountain's south slope are angled more towards direct sunlight and thus are considered the "sunny", or "yang", side.

== History ==
=== Early history ===
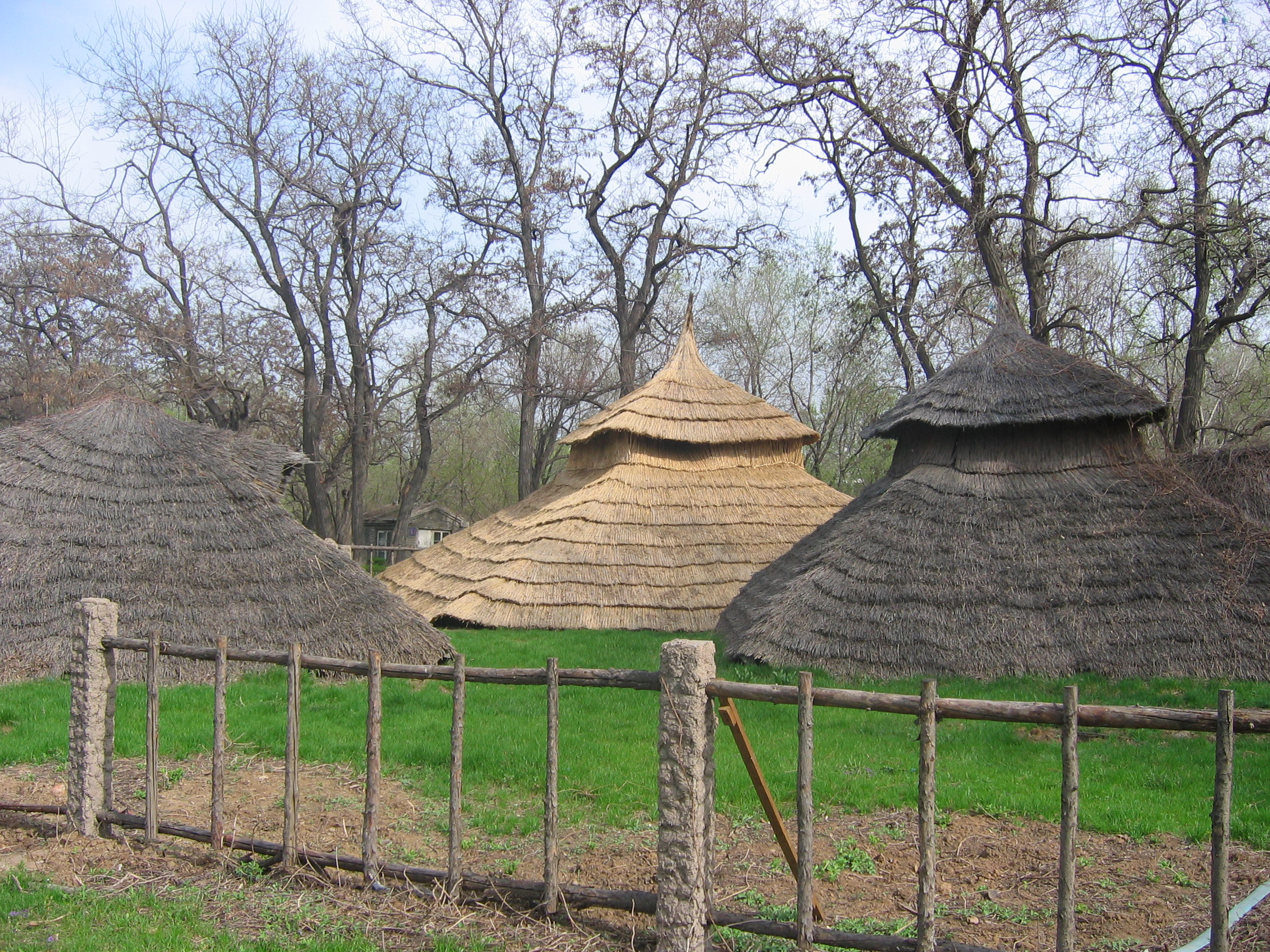
Xinle Ruins

Archaeological findings show that humans resided in present-day Shenyang as early as 8000 years ago. The remains of the Xinle culture, a late Neolithic period society over 6800–7200 years old, are located in a museum in the north part of Huanggu District. It is complemented by a recreated village on site.

The city now known as Shenyang was first established c. 300 BCE during the Warring States period by Yan general Qin Kai, who conquered the Liaodong region from Gojoseon. It was then named Hou City (侯城; Hóu Chéng). Around 350 years later, during the reign of Emperor Guangwu of Han, the city was sacked and burnt by the Donghu nomads and subsequently abandoned. The area of modern Shenyang was divided between two commanderies called Liaodong and Xuantu c. 107 CE. Liaodong was seized by Gongsun Du in 189 while Liaodong and Xuantu were briefly united under Cao Wei and the Jin dynasty (266–420). The region was in disarray during the fourth century until the Goguryeo occupied both commanderies in 404. Under Goguryeo, the city was called Gaemo. They established the cities of Xuantucheng and Gaimoucheng in the region. The Sui dynasty recaptured the area and established a new Liaodong Commandery in what is now modern Shenyang. In 645, the Tang dynasty invaded Goguryeo and captured Xuantucheng and Gaimoucheng. Soon after, Liaodong was administratively reorganized and enjoyed nearly 250 years of stability and development.

In 916, the Shenyang region was captured by the Liao dynasty and was known as Shen Prefecture (瀋州; Shěn Zhōu) until the end of Jin dynasty (who conquered the region in 1116). The area became known as the Shenyang Circuit (瀋陽路; Shěnyáng Lù) during the Yuan dynasty. After the fall of the Yuan, Shenyang came under the control of the Ming dynasty, and it was designated a guard town named Shenyang Central Guard (瀋陽中衛; Shěnyáng Zhōngwèi). During the Ming dynasty, Shenyang became one of the most important Chinese military strongholds beyond the Shanhai Pass.

=== Manchu period ===
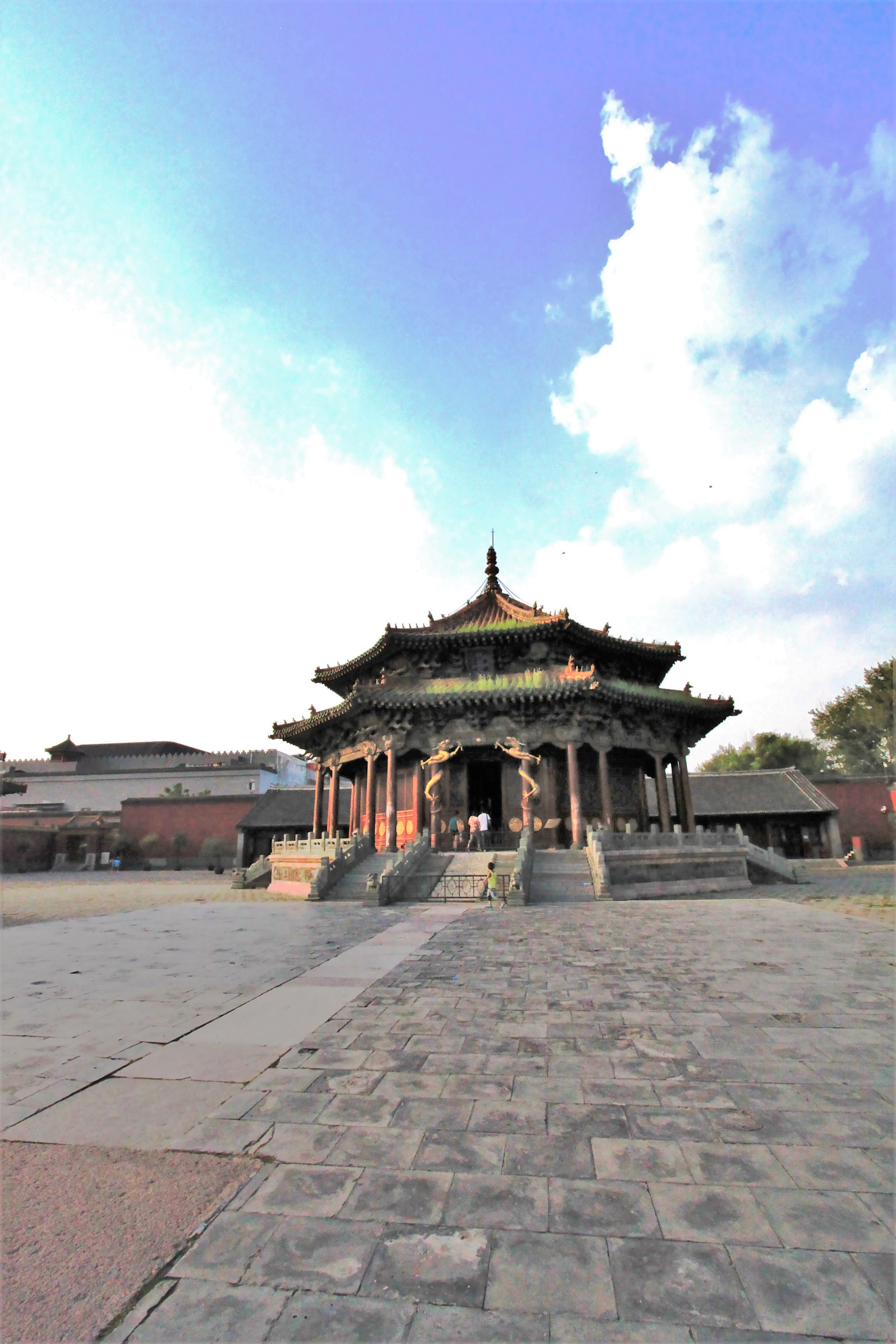
The Mukden Palace

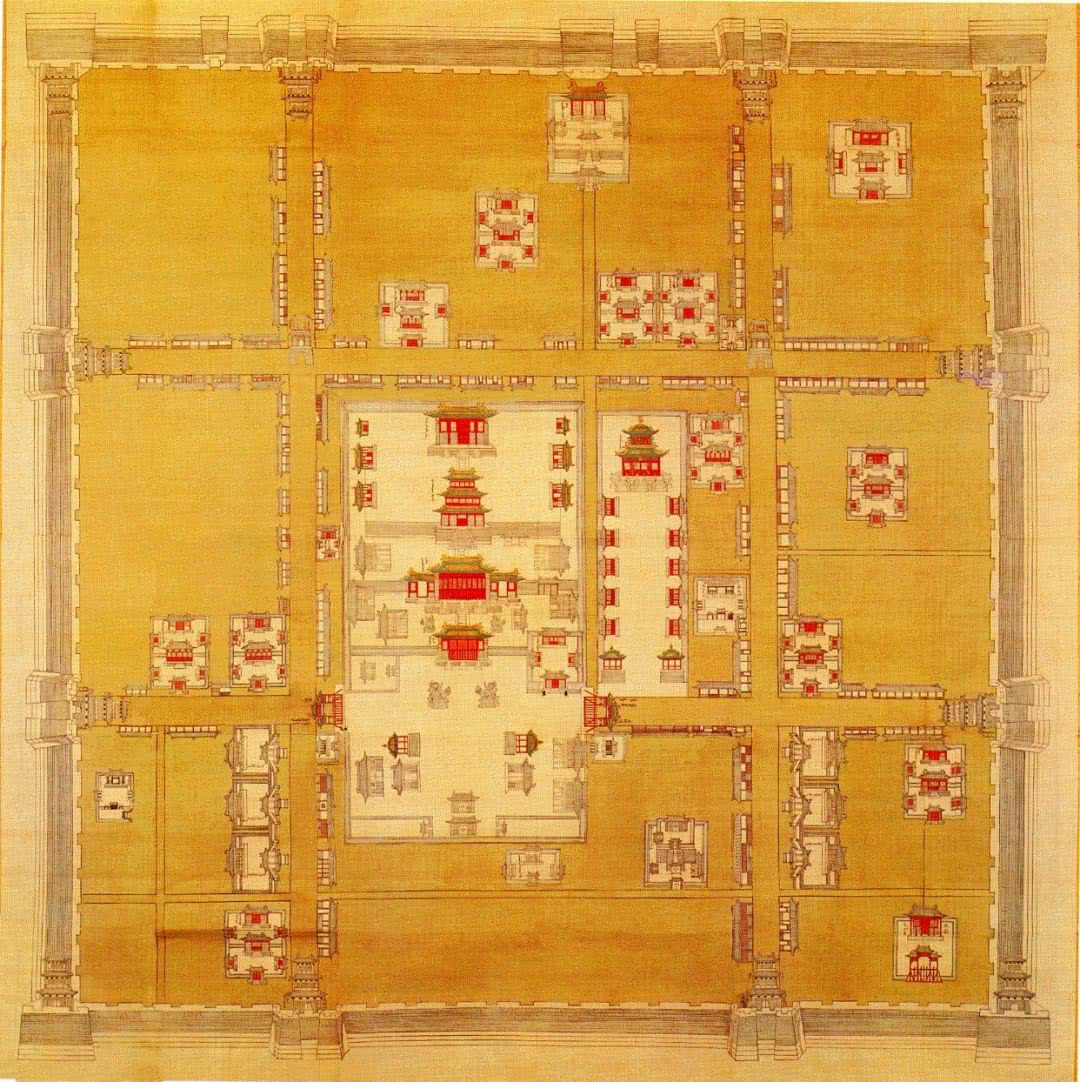
Map of Shengjing Inner City in 1660s

In 1625, the Jurchen leader Nurhaci captured Shenyang from the Ming and decided to relocate his entire administrative infrastructure to the city, which was then called Simiyan hoton (Manchu: ᠰᡳᠮᡳᠶᠠᠨ
ᡥᠣᡨᠣᠨ) in the Manchu language, Simiyan itself being the Manchu's homophonic translation of the Korean's rendering of the name Shenyang (심양). The official name was changed to Mukden (Manchu: ᠮᡠᡴ᠋ᡩᡝᠨ), or Shengjing (盛京; Shèng Jīng; 'rising capital') in 1634. The new name derives from the Manchu word, mukdembi (Manchu: ᠮᡠᡴ᠋ᡩᡝᠮᠪᡳ), meaning 'to rise' as reflected also by its Han Chinese name. Under Nurhaci's orders, the Imperial Palace was constructed in 1626, symbolizing the city's emerging status as the Jurchen political center. The palace featured more than 300 ostentatiously decorated rooms and 20 gardens as a symbol of power and grandeur.

After the fall of the Ming dynasty in 1644 and the routing of the Shun army in the Battle of Shanhai Pass just a day later, the Manchus successfully entered the Shanhai Pass to establish the Qing dynasty in China proper. The capital was subsequently relocated from Shenyang to Beijing. However, Shenyang retained considerable importance as the secondary capital and spiritual home of the Qing dynasty through the centuries. Treasures of the royal house were kept at its palaces, and the tombs of the early Qing rulers were once among the most famous monuments in China. In 1657, Fengtian Prefecture (奉天府; Fèngtiān Fǔ; Manchu: ᠠᠪᡴᠠᡳ
ᡳᠮᡳᠶᠠᠩᡤᠠ
ᡶᡠ, Möllendorff: abkai imiyangga fu, Abkai: abkai imiyangga fu or Manchu: ᡶᡠᠩ ᡨᡳᠶᠠᠨ, Möllendorff: fung tiyian, Abkai: fung tiyian) was established in the Shenyang area, and Fengtian was sometimes used synonymously with Shenyang/Mukden.

=== Russian and Japanese influence ===
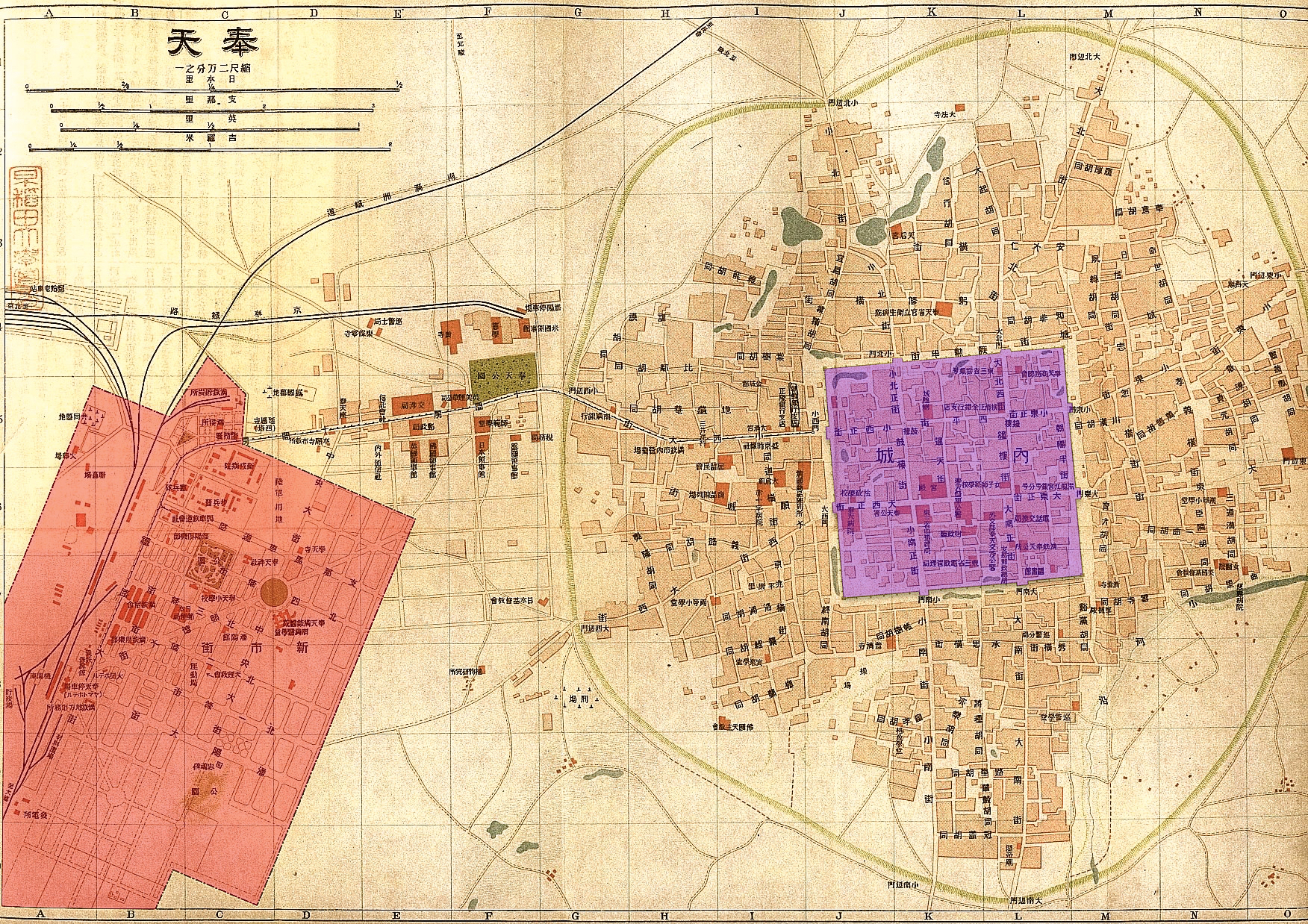
Japanese-administered zone (red) and the old Shenyang city (violet) in 1919

After the First Sino-Japanese War of 1894–1895, Japan coerced the annexation of the Liaodong Peninsula with the Treaty of Shimonoseki in 1895, but had to give it up due to diplomatic pressure from the 1895 Triple Intervention. In the aftermath of the Japanese threat, Qing viceroy Li Hongzhang visited Moscow in 1896 and signed a secret treaty with Russian foreign minister Aleksey Lobanov-Rostovsky, allowing the Russian Empire to build a Russian-gauge railway through Manchuria, which opened the door towards further Russian expansionism in the form of another lease convention in 1898, effectively allowing Russia to annex Port Arthur in all but name. However, after the Boxer Rebellion in 1900, Russian forces used that anti-foreigner insurgency as a pretext to formally invade and occupy most of Manchuria, and Mukden became a Russian stronghold in the Far East with the building of what would become the South Manchurian Railway - from Harbin via Mukden to Dalny.

During the Russo-Japanese War (1904–1905), Mukden became the site of the Battle of Mukden from February 19 to March 10, 1905. Involving more than 600,000 combat participants, it was the largest battle since the Battle of Leipzig in 1813, and also the largest modern-era battle ever fought in Asia before World War II. Following this Japanese victory, Mukden became one of the chief bases of Japanese presence and economic expansion into southern Manchuria. It also became the government seat of Fengtian province in 1910. Mukden became one of the main epicenters of the Manchurian plague (1910–1911), which ultimately resulted in approximately 60,000 deaths.

=== Warlord Era and Japanese occupation ===
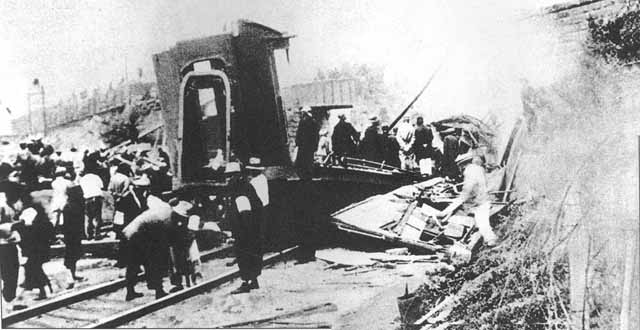
Zhang Zuolin's train after the Huanggutun Incident

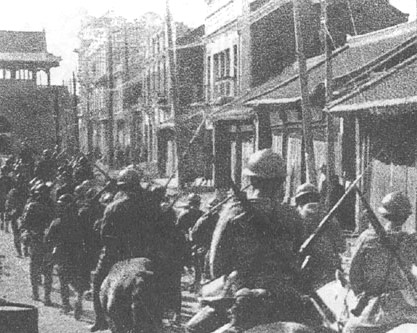
Japanese troops entering Shenyang during the Mukden Incident

In 1914, the city changed back to its old name Shenyang, but continued to be known as Mukden (sometimes spelled Moukden) in some English sources and in Japan through much of the first half of the 20th century. The postmark of the Chinese postal administration kept the spelling "MOUKDEN/奉天" for usage on international mails until the late 1920s. After that, a Chinese–Manchurian bilingual type "SHENYANG (MUKDEN)/瀋陽 (奉天)" datestamp was used until 1933.

In the early 20th century, Shenyang began expanding out of its old city walls. The Shenyang Railway Station on the South Manchurian Railway and the Shenyang North Railway Station on the Jingfeng Railway, both west of the old city, became the new commercial centers of Shenyang. In the 1920s, Mukden was the capital of the warlord Zhang Zuolin, who was later assassinated when his train was blown up on 4 June 1928 at a Japanese-guarded railway bridge. At the time, several factories were built by Zhang to manufacture ammunition in the northern and eastern suburbs. These factories laid the foundation for Shenyang's industrial development.

At around 10:20 pm on 18 September 1931, a small quantity of dynamite was detonated close to a railway line near Mukden owned by the Japanese South Manchuria Railway Company by Kwantung Army Lt. Kawamoto Suemori. The Imperial Japanese Army, accusing Chinese dissidents of the act, then used the false flag explosion as pretext to launch a full attack on Mukden, and captured the city the following morning (September 19). After the Mukden Incident, the Japanese further invaded and occupied the rest of Manchuria, and created the puppet state of Manchukuo with the deposed emperor Aisin Gioro Puyi as the figurehead. During the Manchukuo era (1932–1945), the city was again called Fengtian (and Mukden in English), and was developed by the Japanese into a center of heavy industry. Japan was able to exploit resources in Manchuria using the extensive network of railroads. For example, vast expanses of Manchurian forest were chopped down. The development of Shenyang was also unbalanced in this period; municipal facilities were mostly located in Japanese residential areas, while Chinese residential areas had poor living conditions.

=== Post-World War II ===
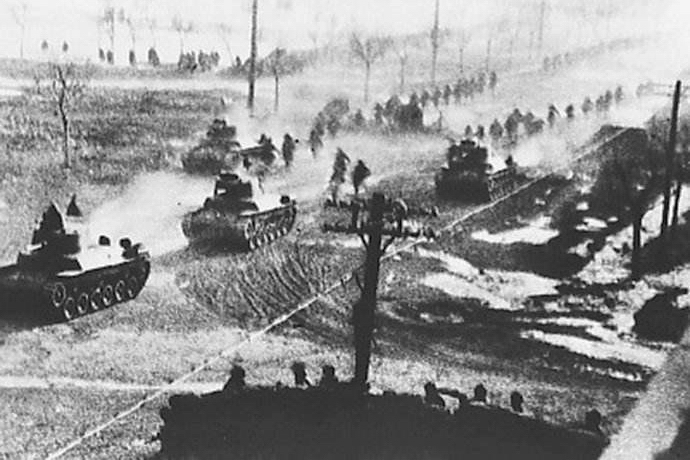
People's Liberation Army Type 97 Chi-Ha tanks advancing into Shenyang during the Liaoshen Campaign

Under Marshal of the Soviet Union Aleksandr Vasilevsky, the Far East Command of the Red Army occupied Manchuria in early August 1945 following the surrender of Japan. On 16 August 1945, Manchurian Emperor Puyi was captured in Shenyang Airport by the Soviets while he was in an airplane fleeing to Japan. On 20 August, Soviet troops captured Shenyang. British and US reports indicate that the Soviet troops that occupied Manchuria and Eastern Inner Mongolia region looted and terrorized the people of Shenyang, and were not discouraged by Soviet occupation authorities from "three days of rape and pillage".

The Soviets were replaced by the Republic of China Army, who were flown in on U.S. transport planes. During the Chinese Civil War, Shenyang remained a Kuomintang stronghold supplied by Claire Lee Chennault's Civil Air Transport from 1946 to 1948, although the Chinese Communist Party controlled the surrounding countryside. By February 1948 the city was suffering from drastic shortages, and by the summer 140,000 refugees per month were fleeing. It was captured by the People's Liberation Army on October 30, 1948, following a series of offensives led by Lin Biao known as the Liaoshen Campaign.

Over the past 200 years or so, Shenyang managed to grow and increase its industrial might during consecutive wars with Russia and Japan in the late 19th and early 20th centuries, the Second World War, and China's Civil War (Shenyang became the main battleground between the Communists and Nationalists).

=== 21st century ===
Directed by state efforts to reduce pollution and close unprofitable industry, the city has undergone deindustrialization and, till the early 2000s, suffered mass unemployment issues with the shutdown of large plants, a situation that became widely known as Xiagang (下岗: step down from the post). Most notably, a large 1930s smelter in the central city was closed in 2000. The redevelopment of former polluted industrial land has resulted in gentrification.

== Old City ==
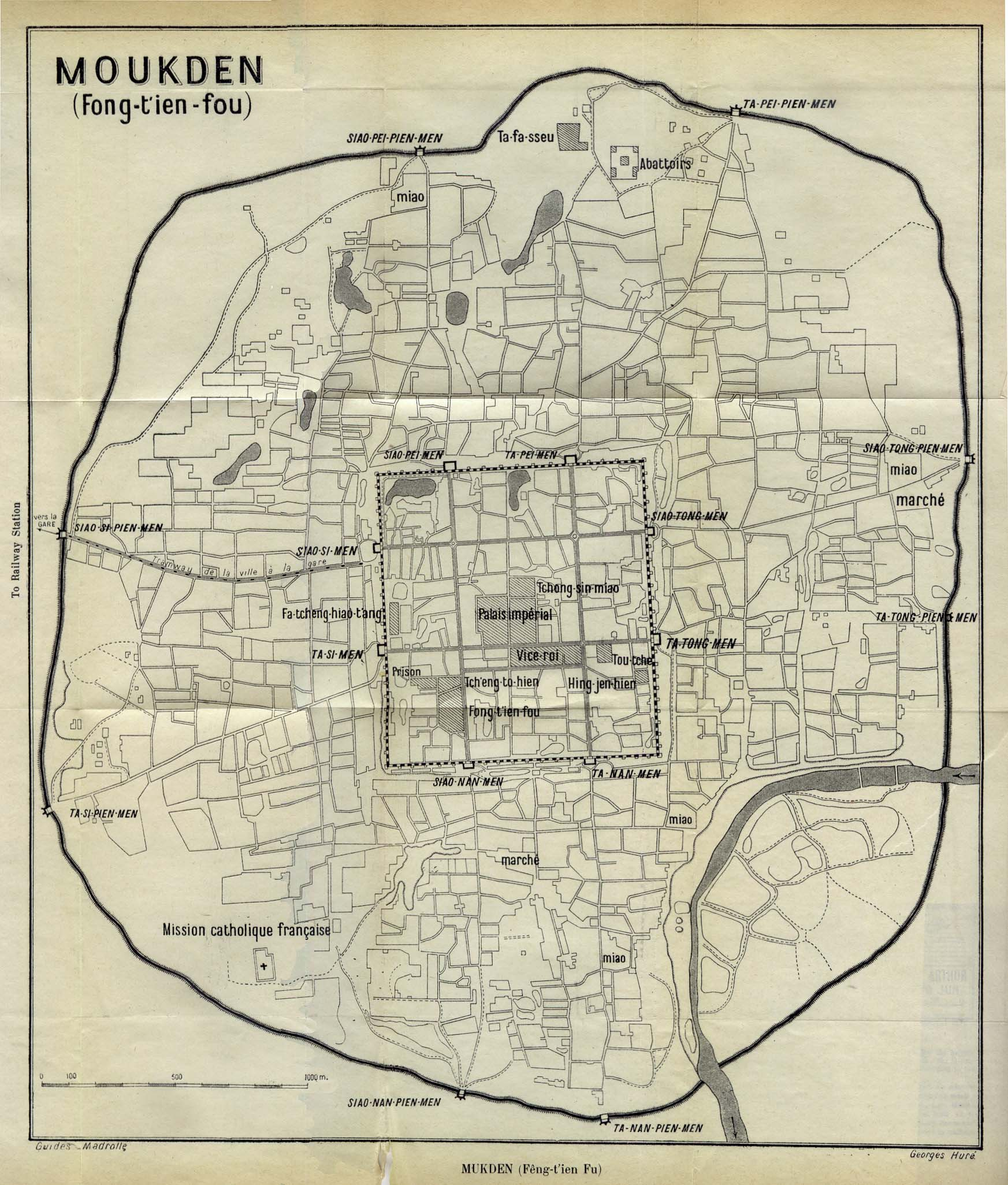
Layout of Shenyang's old city walls

The old city of Shenyang resided almost entirely within the modern day Shenhe District, and used to have two city walls.

Situated roughly within the area bounded by the four "Shuncheng" (顺城; 'along the city') roads/streets in Shenhe District, the (now-demolished) square-shaped inner city wall marked the bounds of ancient Shenyang. The earliest wall was built in 926 during early Liao dynasty to settle Northern Song civilians the Khitans abducted from raids to use as slave labourers, and was then made of rammed earth because the city was merely a small settlement at the time (historically the administrative center of the Liaodong region was at Liaoyang). However, in 1368, Hongwu Emperor of the newly founded Ming dynasty ordered a new regional military command—the Liaodong Regional Military Commission (遼東都指揮使司)—to be established, and Shenyang was made a prominent regional "guard town" (衛所). In 1388, Min Zhong (閔忠), the newly appointed city commissioner of the Shenyang Central Guard, wrote to Hongwu Emperor immediately upon his tenure requesting permission to upgrade the city wall, and the old wall was made taller and thoroughly reinforced with overlaid bricks. According to History of Ming, the reconstructed Ming-era wall was 2.5 zhàng (8 metres or 26 feet) tall, more than 1 zhàng (3.2 metres or 10.5 feet) wide at the top, and 9 li and 30 bu (about 5.2 kilometres or 3.2 miles) long. It has two layers of moats dug outside, each being 3 zhàng (9.6 metres or 31.5 feet) wide and 8 chi (2.56 metres or 8 feet 4.8 inches) deep, fed with water from the Little Shen River (the present day South Canal). There were four city gates, each at the center of one side, connected by two main roads that intersected at Central Temple of the city's center in a "+" fashion.

This Ming wall was heavily damaged in 1625 when the Manchus laid siege and captured the city, with only the north wall and gate tower (which had undergone reinforcing reconstructions in 1545 under the orders of Jiajing Emperor) remained intact. The Manchu leader Nurhachi however saw the city's strategic value and decided to formally relocate his Later Jin capital from Liaoyang to Shenyang, and ordered the wall to be rebuilt. According to Annals of Mukden (盛京通志), the new city wall was a standard black brick wall standing at a height of 3.5 zhàng (about 12.5 metres or 41.0 feet), a width of 1.8 zhàng (about 6.4 metres or 21.0 feet) and a total length of 9 li and 332 bu (about 6.4 kilometres or 4.0 miles), complete with 12 towers (8 gates and 4 corners) and a widened 14.5-zhàng (about 52-metre or 171-foot) moat. The city gates were increased from four to eight, though the old Ming-era north gate tower was preserved but sealed shut, later known as the "Ninth Gate" (九門).

The outer city wall, called the "peripheral wall" (邊牆; Biān Qiáng) or "pass wall" (關牆; Guān Qiáng), was actually a rammed earth rampart built in 1680 to expand the urban area outside the inner city. It was almost round in shape, standing at a height of 7.5 chi (around 2.7 metres or 8 feet 10.3 inches) and an overall length of 32 li and 24 bu (about 20.7 kilometres or 12.9 miles), and also had eight towerless gates known as the "peripheral gates" (邊門; Biān Mén). The corresponding inner and outer gates were linked by roads that intersected within the inner city in a "#" pattern around the Mukden Palace.

Nearly all of these city walls and gates were demolished after 1949. Two gates and one corner tower of the inner wall were rebuilt during the 1990s. There had, however, been proposals to rebuild the other gates and towers in preparation to the 12th National Games in 2013.

Around 2.5 km (1.6 mi) outside Shenyang's former outer wall, there were four pagodas each located within an associated Tibetan Buddhist temple, namely the East Pagoda in Yongguang Temple (永光寺), the South Pagoda in Guangci Temple (廣慈寺), the West Pagoda in Yanshou Temple (延壽寺) and the North Pagoda in Falun Temple (法輪寺). They were built in 1643 and completed in 1645. The four pagodas are identical white Buddha-stupas as tall as 26 m (85 ft). Nowadays only the temple for the North Pagoda is well preserved, the East and South has only the pagodas left, and the temple for the West Pagoda was rebuilt in 1998.

Both the Temple of Heaven and Temple of Earth were also to be found in the old city during the Qing dynasty. They were smaller replicas of Beijing's counterparts. Neither exists today.

== Geography ==
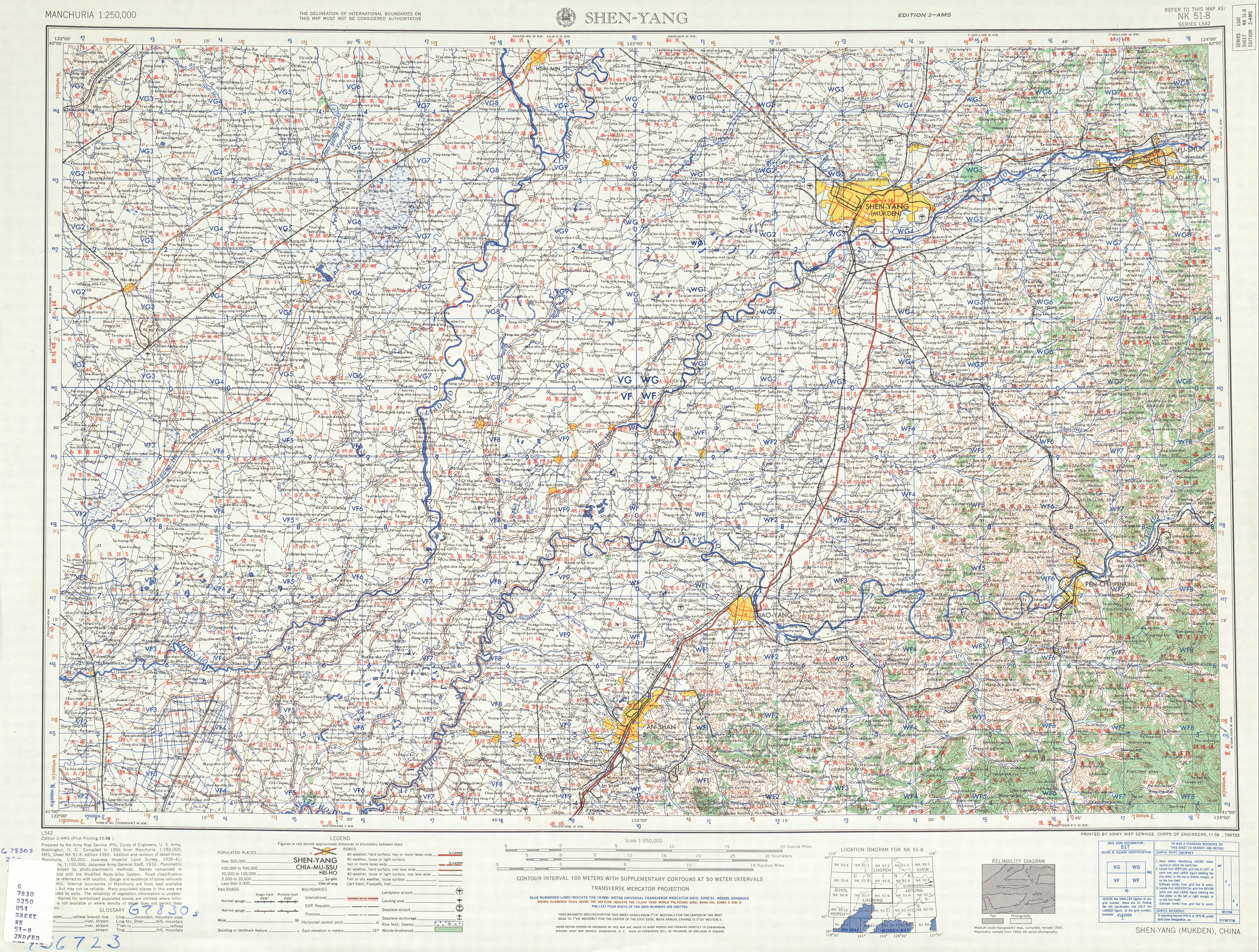
Map including Shenyang (labeled as 瀋陽 SHEN-YANG (MUKDEN)) (AMS, 1956)

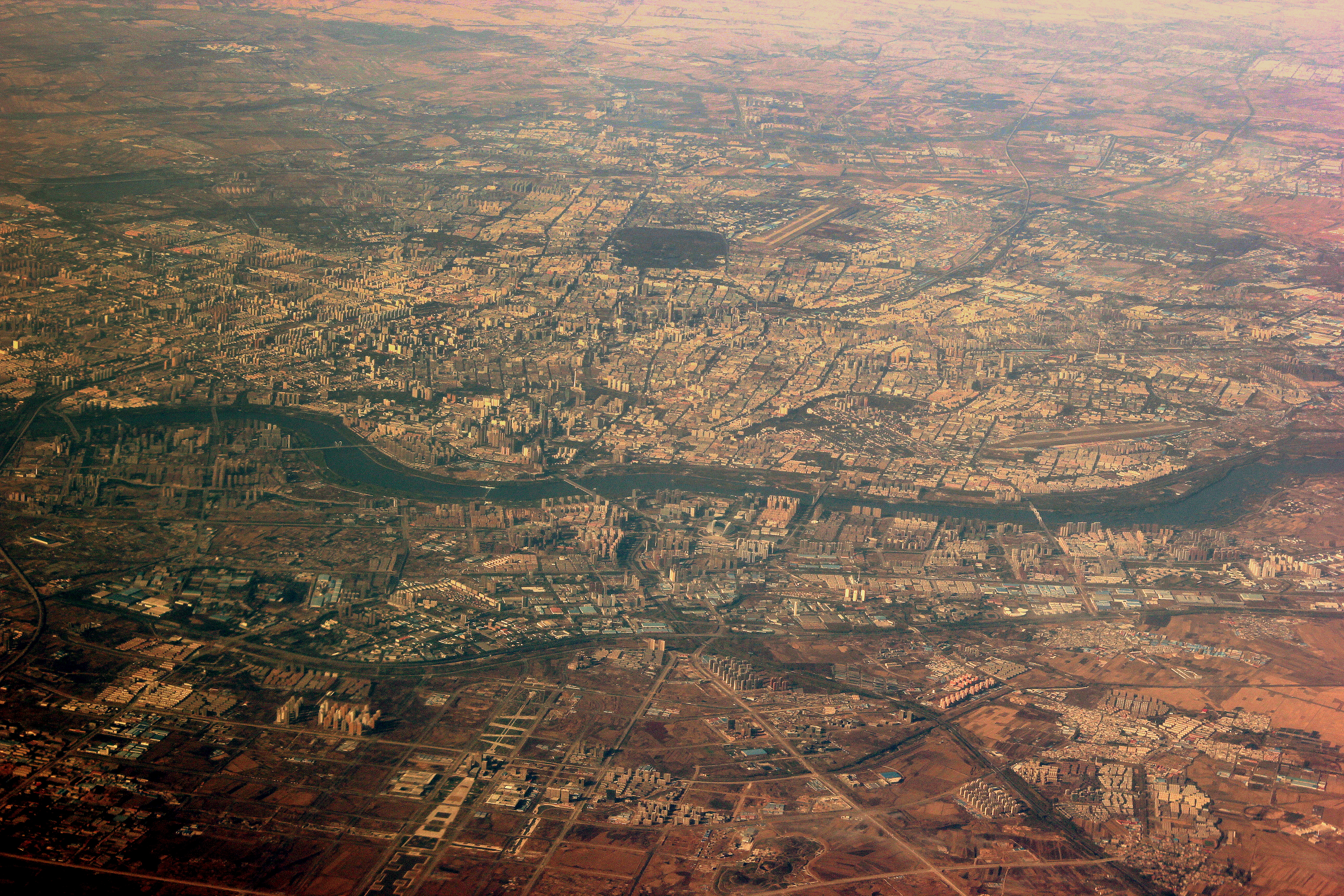
Aerial photograph of Shenyang

Shenyang ranges in latitude from 41° 11' to 43° 02' N and in longitude from 122° 25' to 123° 48' E, and is located in the central part of Liaoning province. The western parts of the city's administrative area are located on the alluvial plain of the Liao River system, while the eastern part consists of the hinterlands of the Changbai Mountains, and is covered with forests. The highest point in Shenyang is 414 m (1,358 ft) above sea level and the lowest point only 7 m (23 ft). The average elevation of the urban area is 45 m (148 ft).

The city's main urban area is located to the north of Hun River, formerly the largest tributary of the Liao River proper and often locally referred as the city's "mother river". The central urban area is surrounded by three artificial rivers — respectively the South Canal (南运河) from the south and southeast, the Xinkai River (新开河, formerly the North Canal) from the north and northeast, and the Weigong River (卫工河, formerly the Weigong Nullah) from the west, all interconnected by channels as a continuous waterway. The South Canal in particular, famous for the series of linear parks and gardens along it, was canalized from the old course of the Wanquan River (萬泉河; 'ten thousand springs river'), historically also called the Little Shen River (小瀋水) or Wuli River (五里河; 'five-li river'), which was a principal water source for the old city. These are reinforced on the peripheries by smaller rivers such as Xi River (细河), Puhe River (蒲河) and Mantang River (满堂河), and drains into the Hun River at three different locations on the southeast, due south and southwest side of the city. There was also previously another canal on the east side called Huishan Nullah (辉山明渠) that drains into Xinkai River's lower section, but is now no longer existent due to land reclamation from urban constructions.

=== Environment ===
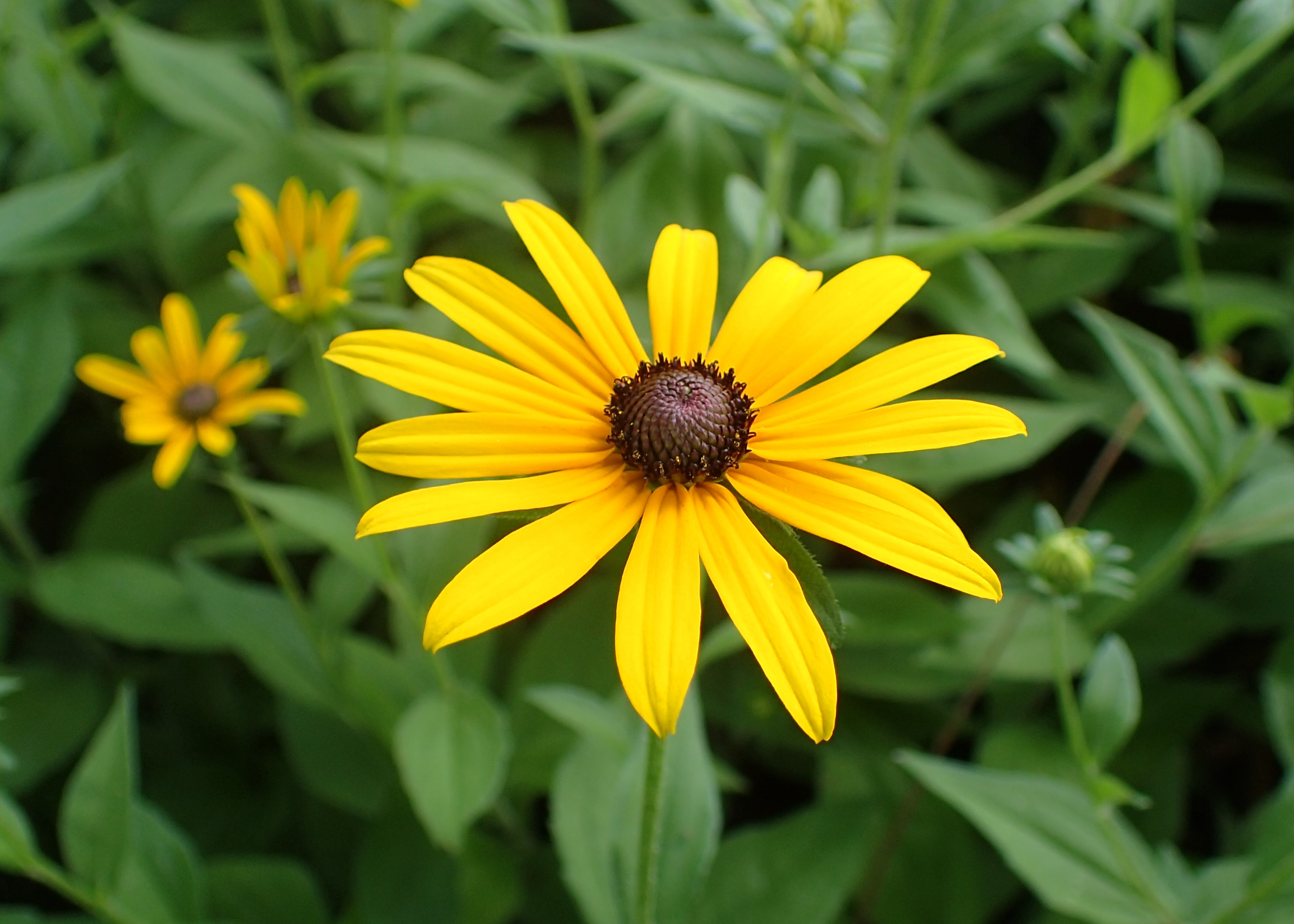
Rudbeckia hirta

Shenyang has many parks, among the most famous are the 14.5 km (9.0 mi) South Canal Linear Parks (南运河带状公园) situated along the homonymous river traversing the southern parts of Dadong, Shenhe and Heping Districts. It comprises 6 large parks and 18 riverside gardens covering an area of approximately 1,400,000 m^{2} (350 acres), with exotic variety of vegetations such as rose, apricot, bladder cherry, honeylocust, natal lily, scarlet sage, morning glory and black-eyed-Susan, and extensive greenspaces of peach, pear, crabapples, ginkgos, weeping willows, pines and black locusts. It is the largest stretch of vegetated urban open space in Shenyang, contributing significantly to the city's 40-percent "greening ratio", and was instrumental in the city being awarded the "national forest city" title in 2005.

According to the Shenyang Environmental Protection Bureau, winter usage of coal by boiler stations for hydronic district heating is the source of 30 percent of the air pollution in Shenyang. Half of the 16 million metric tons of coal consumed by the city during the winter of 2013–2014 were used for heating. Other major factors include dust from construction sites (20 percent), vehicle exhaust (20 percent), industrial emissions (10 percent) and extraterritorial dust (20 percent, mostly yellow dust from Gobi Desert). However, air quality was described by the Bureau as "slowly improving".

=== Climate ===
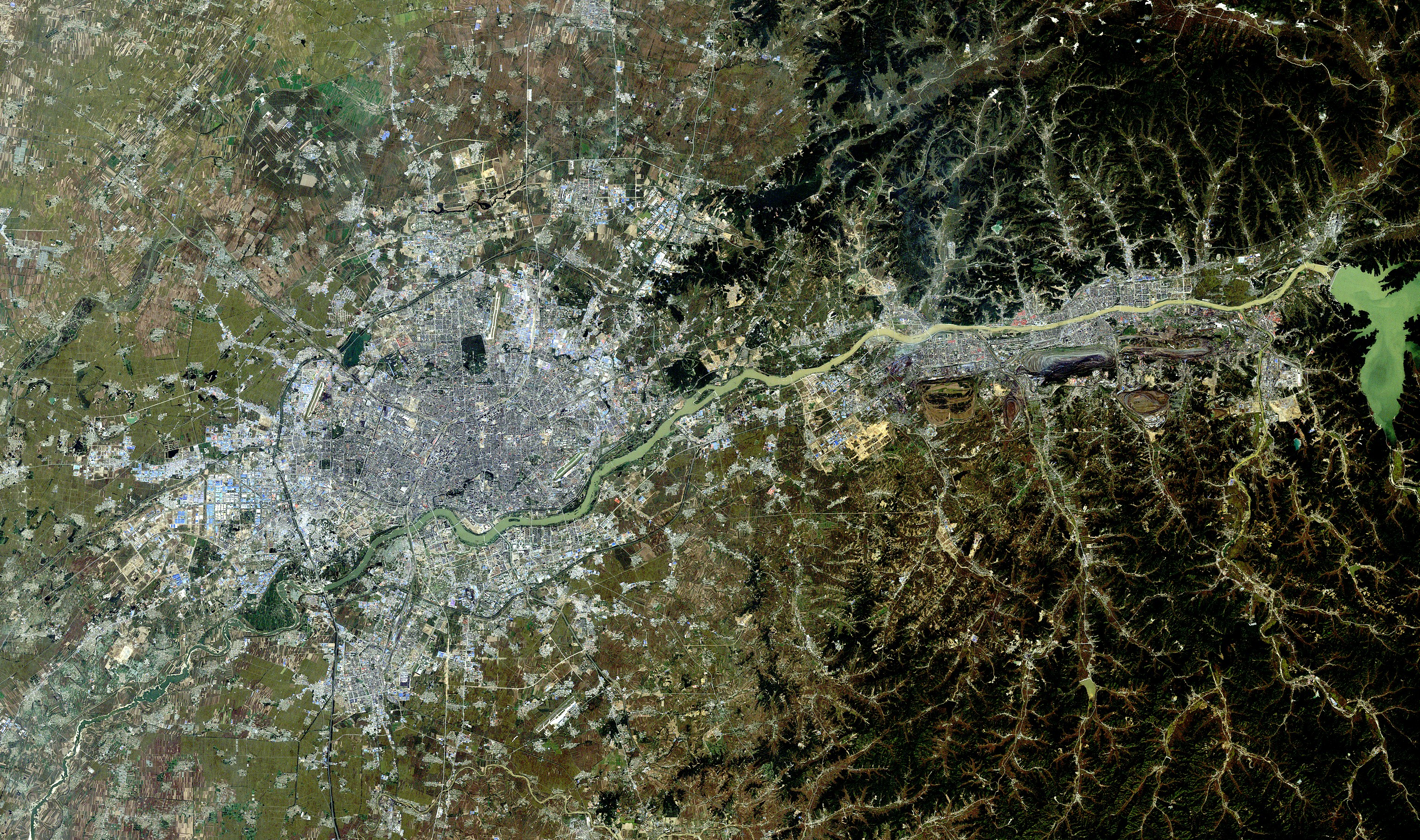
Satellite image of Shenyang-Fushun urban agglomeration (larger western part is Shenyang, eastern part is Fushun), Landsat 5, 2010-09-29.

Shenyang

Climate chart (precipitation, max. and min. temperature)
J	F	M	A	M	J	J	A	S	O	N	D
6 −5 −17	9.7 0 −13	17 8 −4	35 17 4	64 24 12	93 28 17	167 30 21	167 29 19	51 24 12	44 16 4	23 6 −5	12 −3 −14
- █ Average max. and min. temperatures in °C
- █ Precipitation totals in mm
- Source: CMA
Imperial conversion
J	F	M	A	M	J	J	A	S	O	N	D
0.2 23 1	0.4 32 9	0.7 46 25	1.4 63 40	2.5 75 53	3.6 82 62	6.6 85 69	6.6 84 67	2 76 54	1.7 61 39	0.9 42 24	0.5 28 8
- █ Average max. and min. temperatures in °F
- █ Precipitation totals in inches

Shenyang has a monsoon-influenced humid continental climate (Köppen Dwa, Trewartha Dcac) characterised by hot, humid summers due to the monsoon, and dry, cold winters due to the Siberian anticyclone. The four seasons here are distinctive. Nearly half of the annual rainfall occurs in July and August. Monthly mean temperatures range from −11.4 °C (11.5 °F) in January to 24.9 °C (76.8 °F) in July, for an annual average of 8.6 °C (47.5 °F). The frost-free period is 183 days, which is long considering the severity of the winters. The city receives 2,421 hours of bright sunshine annually; monthly percent of possible ranges from 42 percent in July to 64 percent in February. Extreme temperatures range from −33.1 °C (−28 °F) to 38.4 °C (101 °F).

Climate data for Shenyang, elevation 51 m (167 ft), (1991–2020 normals, extremes 1951–present)
Month	Jan	Feb	Mar	Apr	May	Jun	Jul	Aug	Sep	Oct	Nov	Dec	Year
Record high °C (°F)	8.6 (47.5)	17.2 (63.0)	26.1 (79.0)	30.0 (86.0)	36.3 (97.3)	37.5 (99.5)	38.3 (100.9)	38.4 (101.1)	32.9 (91.2)	29.9 (85.8)	23.9 (75.0)	14.1 (57.4)	38.4 (101.1)
Mean daily maximum °C (°F)	−4.8 (23.4)	0.1 (32.2)	7.5 (45.5)	17.1 (62.8)	24.0 (75.2)	27.6 (81.7)	29.5 (85.1)	28.8 (83.8)	24.4 (75.9)	16.3 (61.3)	5.8 (42.4)	−2.5 (27.5)	14.5 (58.1)
Daily mean °C (°F)	−11.4 (11.5)	−6.3 (20.7)	1.7 (35.1)	10.8 (51.4)	17.8 (64.0)	22.3 (72.1)	24.9 (76.8)	23.8 (74.8)	17.9 (64.2)	9.8 (49.6)	0.3 (32.5)	−8.4 (16.9)	8.6 (47.5)
Mean daily minimum °C (°F)	−17.0 (1.4)	−12.0 (10.4)	−3.9 (25.0)	4.3 (39.7)	11.5 (52.7)	16.9 (62.4)	20.6 (69.1)	19.4 (66.9)	12.1 (53.8)	4.0 (39.2)	−4.7 (23.5)	−13.5 (7.7)	3.1 (37.7)
Record low °C (°F)	−33.1 (−27.6)	−28.4 (−19.1)	−25.0 (−13.0)	−12.5 (9.5)	0.1 (32.2)	3.6 (38.5)	12.0 (53.6)	5.7 (42.3)	−2.6 (27.3)	−8.3 (17.1)	−22.9 (−9.2)	−30.5 (−22.9)	−33.1 (−27.6)
Average precipitation mm (inches)	6.0 (0.24)	9.7 (0.38)	16.7 (0.66)	35.2 (1.39)	63.6 (2.50)	92.5 (3.64)	167.0 (6.57)	167.1 (6.58)	50.8 (2.00)	44.1 (1.74)	22.8 (0.90)	12.0 (0.47)	687.5 (27.07)
Average precipitation days (≥ 0.1 mm)	3.7	3.4	4.8	6.6	9.0	11.7	12.2	10.6	6.5	7.0	5.8	4.8	86.1
Average snowy days	4.8	4.5	4.3	1.1	0	0	0	0	0	0.6	4.3	5.8	25.4
Average relative humidity (%)	63	57	52	49	54	67	77	79	72	66	63	64	64
Mean monthly sunshine hours	172.4	192.0	227.3	228.7	250.3	218.4	191.8	204.3	219.9	204.8	158.5	153.0	2,421.4
Percentage possible sunshine	58	64	61	57	55	48	42	48	59	60	54	54	55
Source: China Meteorological Administration all-time extreme temperature

See or edit raw graph data.

== Administrative divisions ==
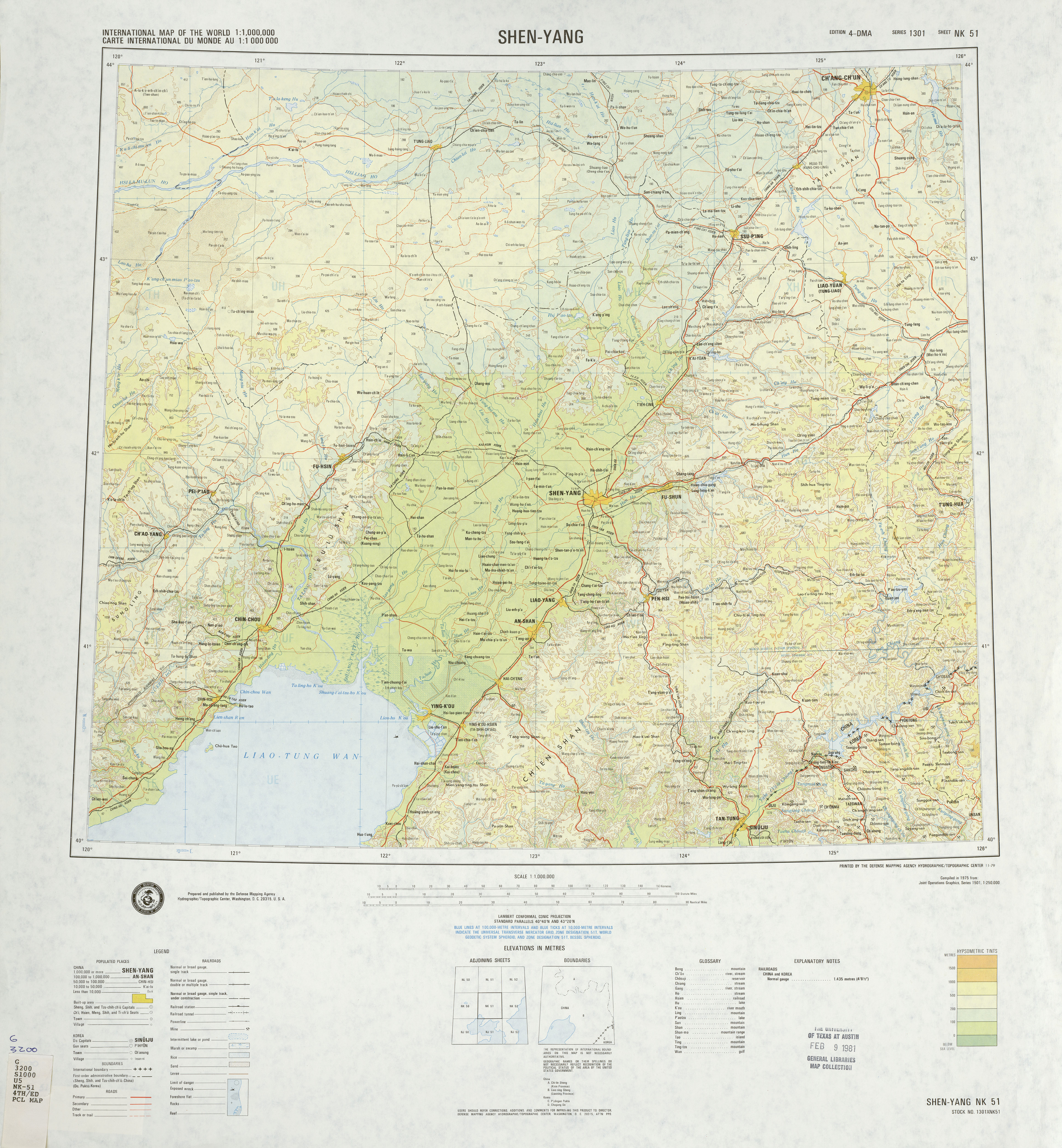
Map of Shenyang (labeled as SHEN-YANG) and surrounding region (1975)

Shenyang's metropolitan area traditionally consisted of the 5 small inner urban districts, surrounded by 4 larger outer suburban districts, and accompanied by 4 rural counties on the north and west sides. In general, agriculture, animal husbandry and agricultural product processing dominate northeastern Shenyang; eastern Shenyang is an automotive parts hub; southern Shenyang is a high-tech industrial base; and western Shenyang is home to heavy machinery manufacturing. The city center specialises in retail and financial services.

Out of the rural counties, the Xinmin County was upgraded to a county-level city in 1993, and the Liaozhong County was incorporated into a new suburban district in 2016 as part of the provincial/national development plan.

As a result, Shenyang now officially has direct jurisdiction over 10 city districts, 1 satellite city and 2 rural counties:

Map
Name	Simplified Chinese	Hanyu Pinyin	Population (2014)	Area (km^{2})	Density (/km^{2})
City proper
Shenhe District	沈河区	Shěnhé Qū	716,417	60	12,037
Heping District	和平区	Hépíng Qū	645,399	59	10,849
Dadong District	大东区	Dàdōng Qū	689,576	100	6,887
Huanggu District	皇姑区	Huánggū Qū	817,288	66	12,349
Tiexi District	铁西区	Tiěxī Qū	907,091	286	3,171
Suburban
Hunnan District	浑南区	Húnnán Qū	324,074	734	442
Sujiatun District	苏家屯区	Sūjiātún Qū	428,859	782	548
Shenbei New Area	沈北新区	Shěnběi Xīnqū	320,370	884	362
Yuhong District	于洪区	Yúhóng Qū	435,333	499	872
Liaozhong District	辽中区	Liáozhōng Qū	532,900	1,645	324
Satellite city
Xinmin City	新民市	Xīnmín Shì	690,703	3,297	210
Rural
Kangping County	康平县	Kāngpíng Xiàn	352,434	2,167	163
Faku County	法库县	Fǎkù Xiàn	447,952	2,281	196

=== Districts ===
==== Shenhe District ====
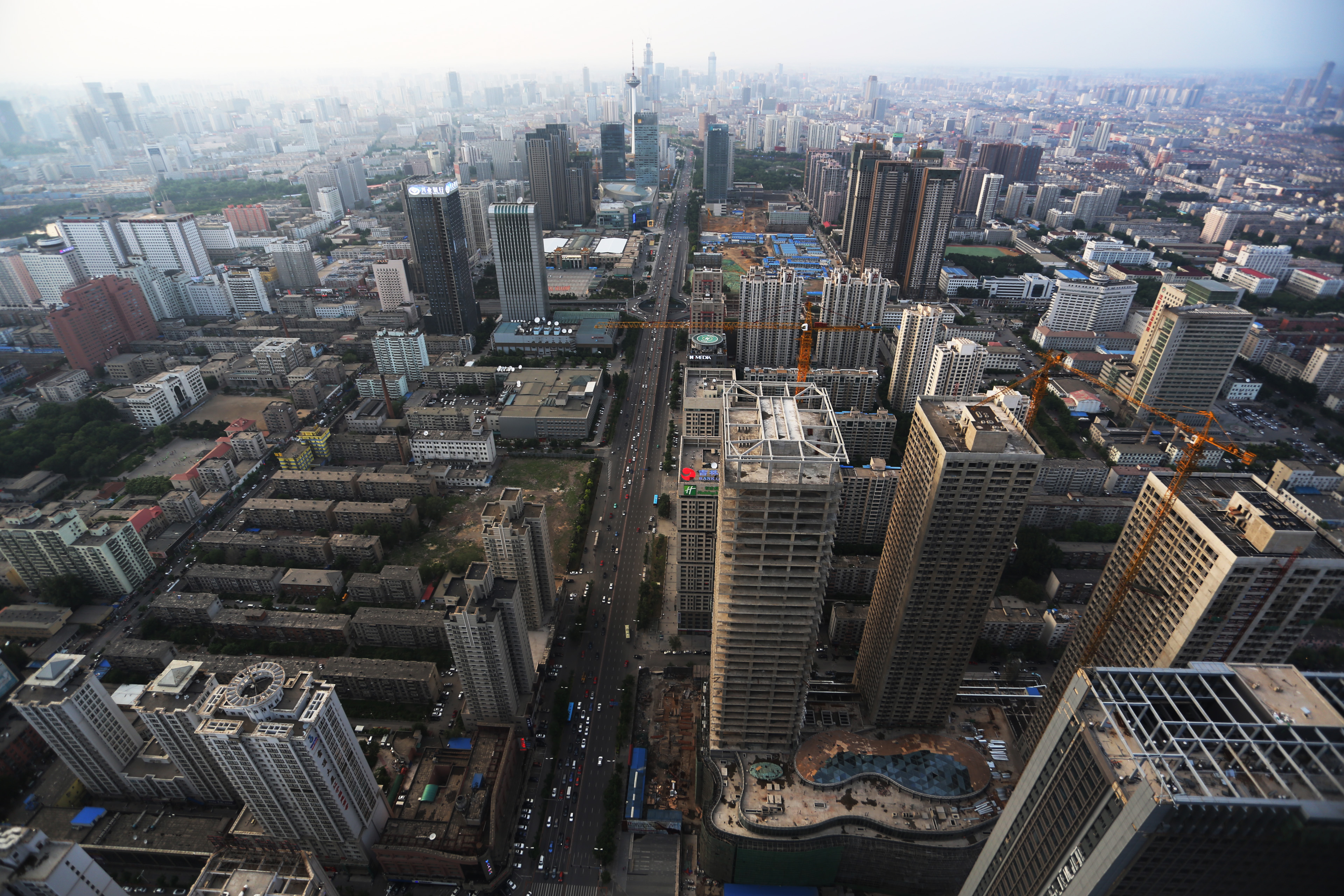
Buildings along Youths Avenue (Qingnian Street, 青年大街) in southern Shenhe District

The Shenhe District (沈河区; 'Shen River district') is a part of the downtown and was also the most developed district in Shenyang. Until 2015, it held the seat of the City Government. The old city wall is entirely located in Shenhe District. It has an area of 60 km^{2} (23 sq mi) and a registered population of 716,417 (as per 2014). There is the Central Temple (中心庙; Zhōngxīn Mìao), built during the Ming dynasty, showing the center of ancient Shenyang. This temple is located just south of the Middle Street (中街; Zhōng Jiē), one of the most famous shopping streets and the first commercial pedestrian zone in China. Shenhe District is also home to the famous Wu'ai Market (五爱市场; Wǔài Shìchǎng), the largest light industry wholesale trading center in the entire Bohai Economic Rim.

Shenhe District is the site of the Mukden Palace, just south of the Central Temple. It is also the site of Zhang Zuolin's former home and headquarters, Shengjing Ancient Cultural Street. In the western Shenhe District there is a Muslim town, and the South Pagoda (南塔; Nán tǎ) is located in southern Shenhe District. There are a lot of high-end hotels located in Shenhe District, such as Sheraton, Kempinski, Lexington, Marriott (which is the first Marriott Hotel directly named "Marriott" in mainland China, but due to finance conflicts is not administered by Marriott International). The major thoroughfare of Youths Avenue (青年大街; Qīngnián Dà Jiē), the city's primary north–south arterial road that traverses past the City Government Square (市府广场; Shìfǔ Guǎngchǎng) at the modern center of the city linking Beiling Park to the Taoxian Airport, separates the southern portion of Shenhe District from the neighbouring southern Heping District. The iconic 305.5 m (1,002 ft) Liaoning Broadcast and TV Tower is situated alongside this avenue.

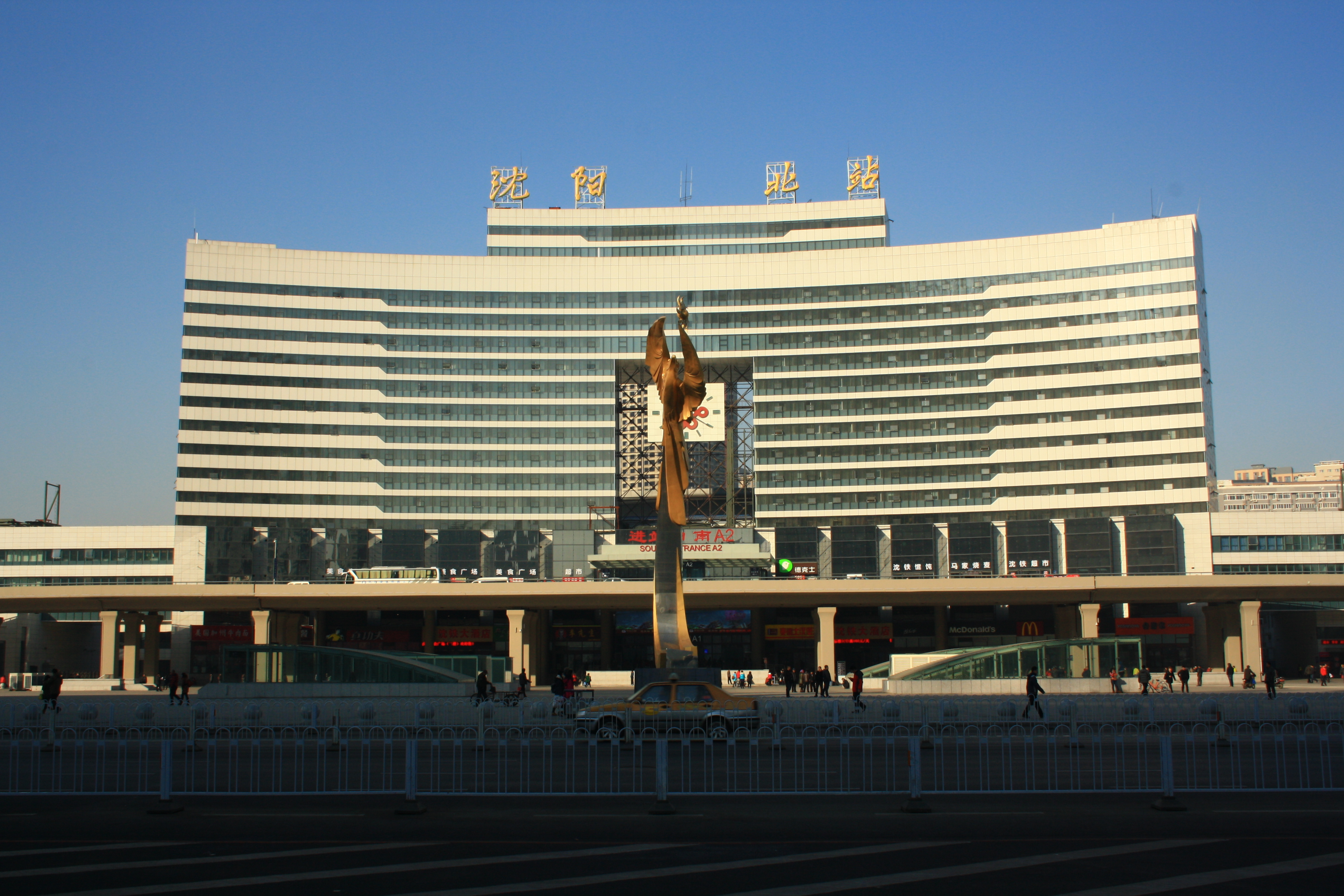
Shenyang North railway station

Shenhe District is also home to Manchuria's main railway hub, the Shenyang North Railway Station (locally known as the "North Station"). The railways leading to the station forms the border between Shenhe District and the neighbouring eastern portion of Huanggu District. The station building has recently undergone a major overhaul and extension.

==== Heping District ====
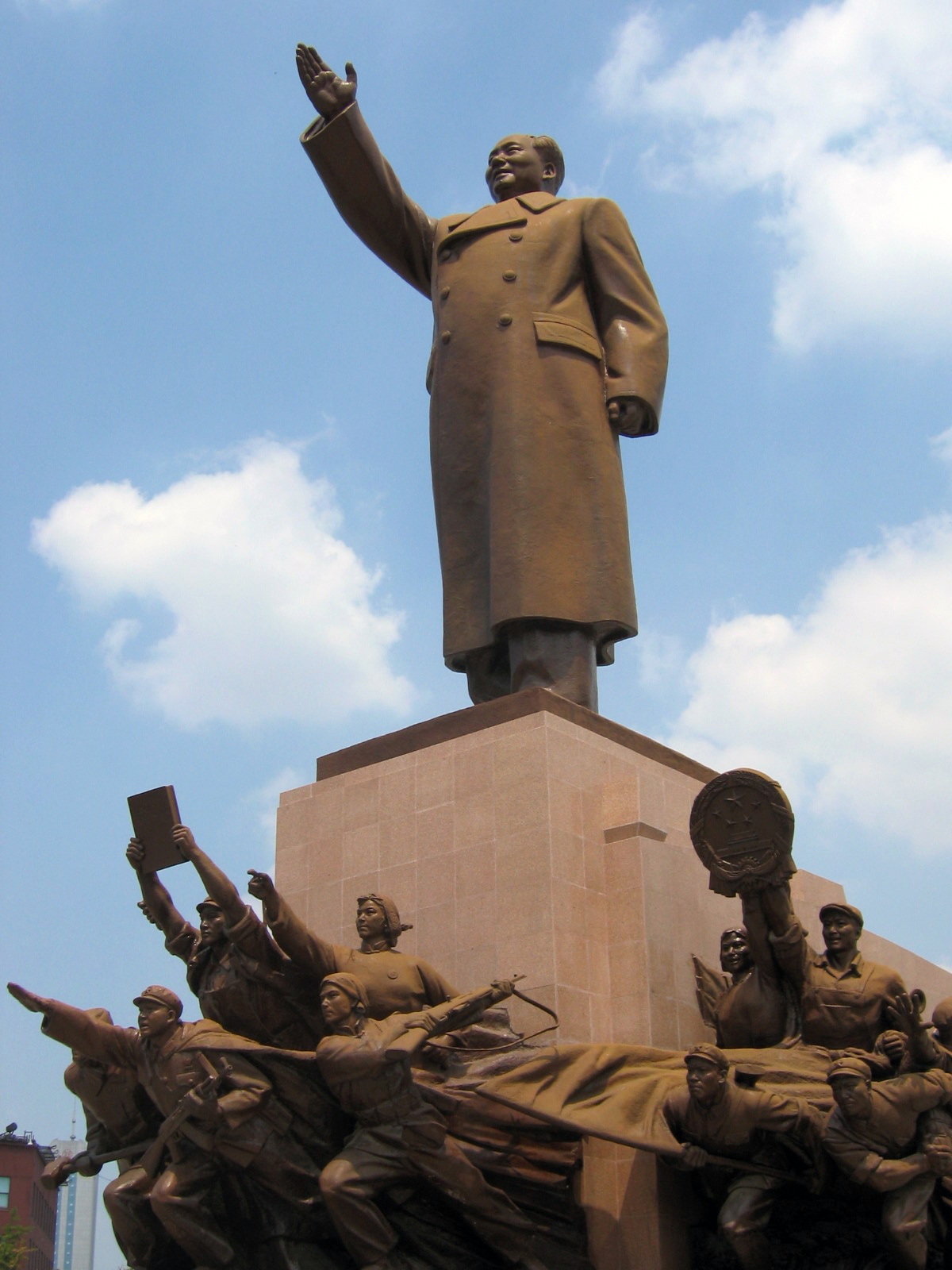
Chairman Mao statue at Zhongshan Square

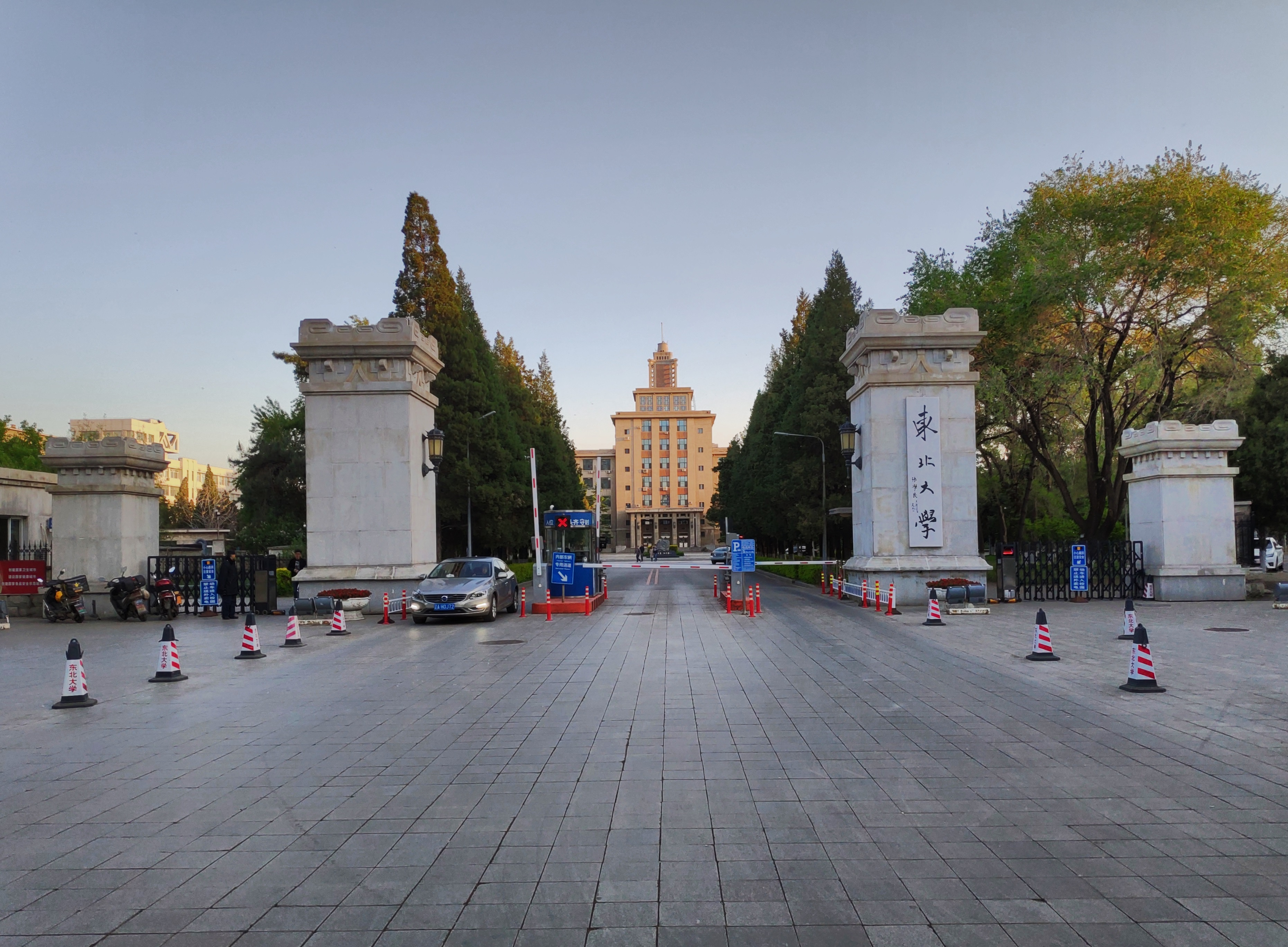
Northeastern University (China) in Heping District, Shenyang

The Heping District (和平区; 'peace district') is located in the downtown of Shenyang, bordered by Shenhe District. It is currently the most developed district in Shenyang. It has an area of 59 km^{2} (23 sq mi) and a population of 645,399 (2014). Heping District has all manner of commercial businesses that are brightly neon-lit at night, centered around Taiyuan Street (太原街; Taìyuán Jīe), one of the most famous shopping district in the Northeast. The Project 985 university, Northeastern University, is also located in Heping District.

The district, better known as the downtown, sprung up around Shenyang Railway Station (known locally as the "South Station" in contrast to the "North Station" in Shenhe District), the former hub of the South Manchurian Railway. At the center of the district is Zhongshan Square (中山广场; Zhōngshān Guǎngchǎng), which features one of China's largest statues of Chairman Mao—a record of the era of the Cultural Revolution. Northwest of Zhongshan Square lies the West Pagoda Korean Neighborhood or Koreatown. Many of the boulevards in this area are lined with very large ginkgo trees, which become golden in color and produce their distinctive fruits in autumn.

Heping District is also the core area for many political institutions in the Northeast, including CPC Liaoning Provincial Committee, headquarters of the Northern Theater Command (previously the Shenyang Military Region), General Logistics Department and the consulates-general of the United States, Japan. South Korea, North Korea and other countries. Northeast Electricity, China Post, railways, other such industrial hubs and many media outlets such as Liaoning Radio and Television, Shenyang Radio and Television and Shenyang Daily newspaper are also located in this district.

==== Dadong District ====
The Dadong District (大东区; 'great east district') is an industrial zone and used to be the largest of the inner city districts. Its name derives from the fact that the district started off as the residential area immediately outside the old inner city wall's Fujin Gate (撫近門), which is also called Great East Gate (大東門). It has an area of 100 km^{2} (39 sq mi) and a population of 689,576 (2014).

The district contains popular tourist landmarks such as the 9.18 Historical Museum, the North and East Pagodas, Bawang Temple and the Wanquan Park. The oldest airfield in Shenyang, the now-defunct East Pagoda Airport, is also located in Dadong District.

==== Huanggu District ====
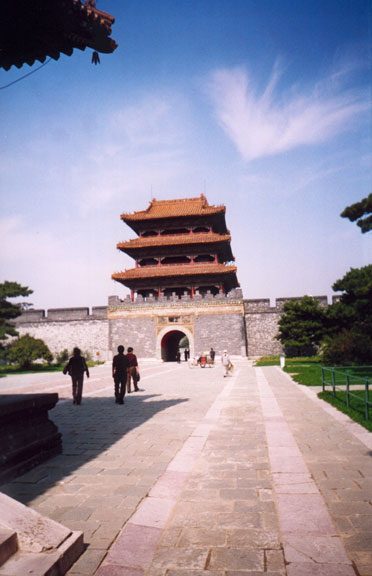
World Heritage Site: Zhao Mausoleum (Beiling park)

The Huanggu District (皇姑区; 'royal aunt district') is named after Huanggutun ("tun" means village), where the Huanggutun Incident took place. The name is actually a mis-transliteration of the pronunciation for Fiyanggū (Manchu: ᡶᡳᠶᠠᠩᡤᡡ, Chinese: 費揚武, 1605–1643), the Manchu Prince Jian of the First Rank whose tomb was in the area. It has an area of 66 km^{2} (25 sq mi) and a population of 817,288 (2014).

The district is the site of Beiling park, the large historical mausoleum of Qing dynasty emperor Huang Taiji, as well as the Liaoning Mansion Hotel. It also hosts the seat of the Provincial Government of Liaoning.

==== Tiexi District ====
The Tiexi District (铁西区; 'railway's west district') is the most populous district and makes up the western part of the inner city, west of the South Manchurian Railway (hence the district's name) and south of the Jingshen Railway, and is famous for its heavy industry. This mixed-use district also contains large blocks of residential complexes, so as well as strips of small to medium-sized shopping districts. It previously had only an area of 39 km^{2} (15 sq mi) and a population of 764,419. In May 2002, the Shenyang city government annexed a large area of suburban land from the neighbouring Yuhong District to establish a new state-level development zone—the Shenyang Economic and Technological Development Zone (沈阳经济技术开发区), and transferred its administration to Tiexi District to form the Tiexi New District (铁西新区), thus giving Tiexi District the current "necked" shape on the map. The new Tiexi District now has a population of 907,091 (2014), a total area of 286 km^{2} (110 sq mi), and enjoys the same administrative rank as a municipality (Administrative Committee of Shenyang).

The district is featured in a 9-hour epic documentary film West of the Tracks by a young filmmaker Wang Bing. It shows the transition in this rust belt district—a palimpsest of not only Chinese but also world history. The first factories of this place were built in 1934 by the Japanese to produce war goods for the Imperial Army and nationalized after World War II. As late as the early 1980s, the factories here employed about one million workers, but their productivity and employment significantly diminished as China modernised towards the end of the 20th century.

==== Hunnan District ====
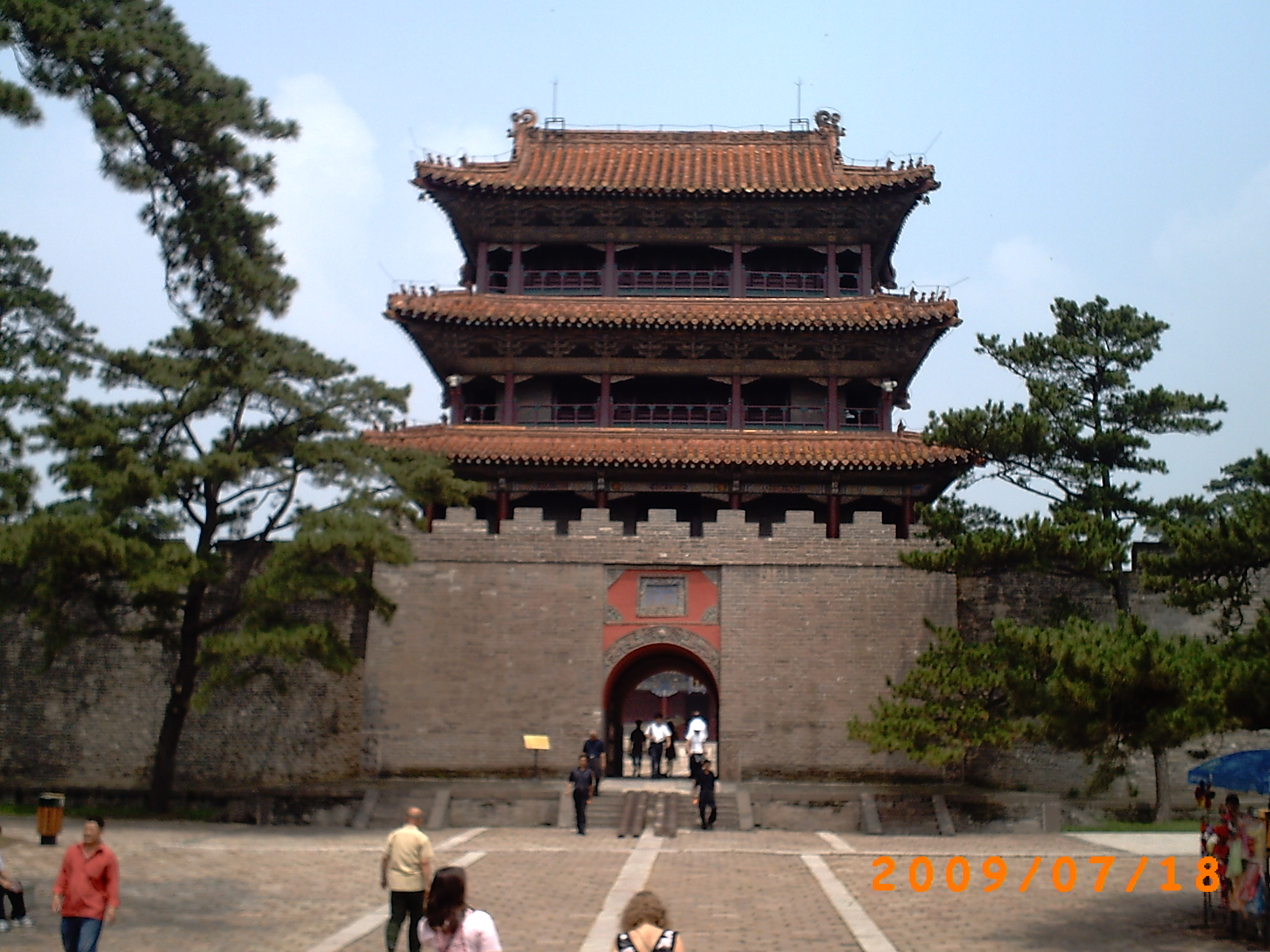
World Heritage Site: Fuling Tomb (Dongling Park)

The Hunnan District (浑南区; 'South of Hun River'), was formerly called the Dongling District (东陵区; 'East Mausoleum district') before June 17, 2014, referring to the UNESCO World Heritage Site-listed tombs dedicated to Nurhachi, the founder of Later Jin, and his empress Monggo-Jerjer. The large suburban district is located on the east and southeast side of urban Shenyang, with most of its territory south of the Hun River, hence its current name. It has an area of 734 km^{2} (283 sq mi) and a population of 324,074 (2014). The Shenyang municipal government moved to Hunnan District on 13 October 2015. The Shenyang Botanical Garden and the Shenyang International Expo Garden (which hosted the 2006 International Horticultural Exposition) are also located in this district.

Hunnan District hosts the city's only operational commercial airport, the Taoxian International Airport, and is rapidly becoming high-end residential areas with luxury apartments, fine neighbourhoods and commercial developments, as Hunnan becomes the new center of Shenyang steadily with the new government being developed there. The district is traversed by two corridors along two major highways, one leading to the Eastern Mausoleum and the neighbouring city of Fushun, and the other leading to the airport.

Launched in 1988 as the Shenyang National New and High-Tech Industrial Development Zone and elevated to a national-level zone in 1991, the Hunnan New Area (浑南新区) focuses on electronic and information technology products such as software, computers, network systems, communication equipment and audio/visual equipment; advanced manufacturing technologies, especially for automobiles, medical equipment; advanced materials and biological and pharmaceutical products. Foreign companies such as the General Electric Co., Tyco International, and Mitsubishi Group operate in the zone.

==== Sujiatun District ====
The Sujiatun District (苏家屯区; 'Su family village district') forms the southernmost part of the suburbs, located 15 km (9 mi) away from central Shenyang. The 2014 registered population of Sujiatun is 428,859. and it has an area of 782 km^{2} (302 sq mi). Sujiatun is known mostly for its agricultural and industrial activity. It borders the districts of Yuhong and Heping to the north, Dongling to the northeast, Tiexi to the northwest; it also borders the prefecture-level cities of Fushun to the east, Benxi to the southeast, and Liaoyang to the southwest.

==== Shenbei New District ====
The Shenbei New District (沈北新区; 'Shenyang's north new district'), formerly Xinchengzi District (新城子区; 'new town district'), is a new development zone and forms the majority of the northern suburbs. It has an area of 884 km^{2} (341 sq mi) and a population of 320,370 (2014). It borders Hunnan District to the southeast, Dadong and Huanggu Districts to the south, Yuhong District to the southwest, Xinmin City and Faku County to the northwest; it also borders the prefecture-level cities of Tieling to the northeast and Fushun to the southeast.

==== Yuhong District ====
The Yuhong District (于洪区; 'Yu and Hong (Chinese surname) district') forms part of the northwestern and western suburbs. It has an area of 499 km^{2} (193 sq mi) and a population of 435,333 (2014). It borders Shenbei New District to the northeast, Huanggu District to the east, Tiexi District to the south, and Xinmin City to the west. China Resources Beverage, the distributor of C'estbon Water, has its Northeast regional office in the district.

The large southwestern part of the neighbouring Tiexi District also used to belong to Yuhong District, but in May 2002, the southwestern part of Yuhong District was ceded on order of the city government to establish the Shenyang Economic and Technological Development Zone, and the administration of the region was later transferred to Tiexi District instead. This annexation of land left an exclave territory lying between Tiexi District, Heping District and Sujiatun District, separated from the main body of Yuhong District, hence making the Tiexi District flanked at the "neck" by the two parts of Yuhong.

==== Liaozhong District ====
The Liaozhong District (辽中区; 'Liaoning's center district', referring to its central location within the province) is the newest and largest suburban district. Formerly the Liaozhong County (辽中县), its rural county status was made defunct in January 2016, and formally instated as a suburban city district on April 11, 2016. It lies 67 km (42 mi) southwest of downtown Shenyang, near the intersection of G1 Beijing–Harbin Expressway and G91 Liaozhong Ring Expressway. As of 2014, it had a population of 532,900 residing in an area of 1,645 km^{2} (635 sq mi). It is the most southwestern part of Shenyang City, bordering Xinmin City to the north, and Tiexi District to the northeast, as well as the prefecture-level cities of Liaoyang to the southeast, Anshan to the south and southwest, and Jinzhou to the west.

=== Rural counties ===
==== Kangping County ====
The Kangping County (康平县; 'prosperous and peaceful county') is the northernmost and most remote part of the Greater Shenyang area, and has an area of 2,167 km^{2} (837 sq mi) with a population of 352,434 (2014). It was historically first established in 1880 under the blessing of the Guangxu Emperor, hence the name. The county borders the Faku County to the south, the prefecture-level cities of Tieling to the east, Fuxin to the southwest and Inner Mongolia's Tongliao to the north. The county is mostly agricultural, with majority of its GDP coming from crop and fruit planting. However, in recent years the synthetic fabric, carbon fiber and alternative energy industries begin to take hold in Kangping. The county currently has the third largest wind farm in the whole province.

== Demographics ==
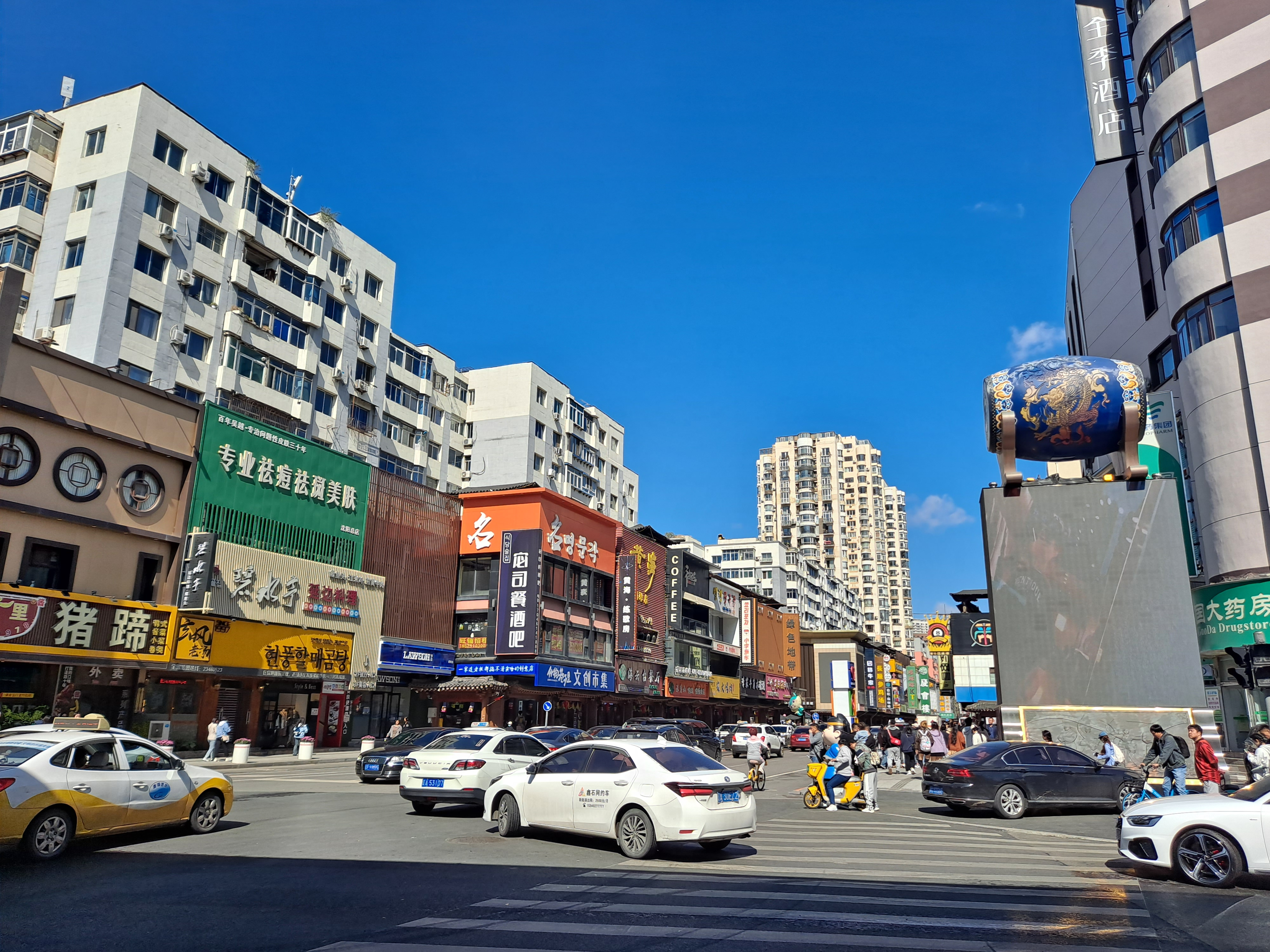
Xita, world's 2nd largest Koreatown.

Shenyang has a population of 9.07 million, 85.12% of which reside in urban areas. Ethnically and culturally diverse, Shenyang has 38 of China's 56 recognized ethnic groups, including the Han Chinese majority that make up 91.26 percent of Shenyang's population. The 37 minority groups are Manchu, Korean, Hui, Xibo, Mongolian, Zhuang, Miao, Tujia, Dong, Daur, Bai, Uyghur, Tibetan, Yi, Taiwanese Aboriginal People, She, Bouyei, Yao, Akha, Kazakh, Dai, Li, Shui, Nakhi, Jingpo, Kyrgyz, Tu, Mulao, Qiang, Maonan, Gelao, Russian, Evenks, Tatars, Oroqen, Nanai and Lhoba. Most of these groups are not native to the Shenyang area; a few, such as the Manchus and the Xibe, are.

Shenyang has numerous temples, mosques, churches and other religious places of worship.

== Economy ==
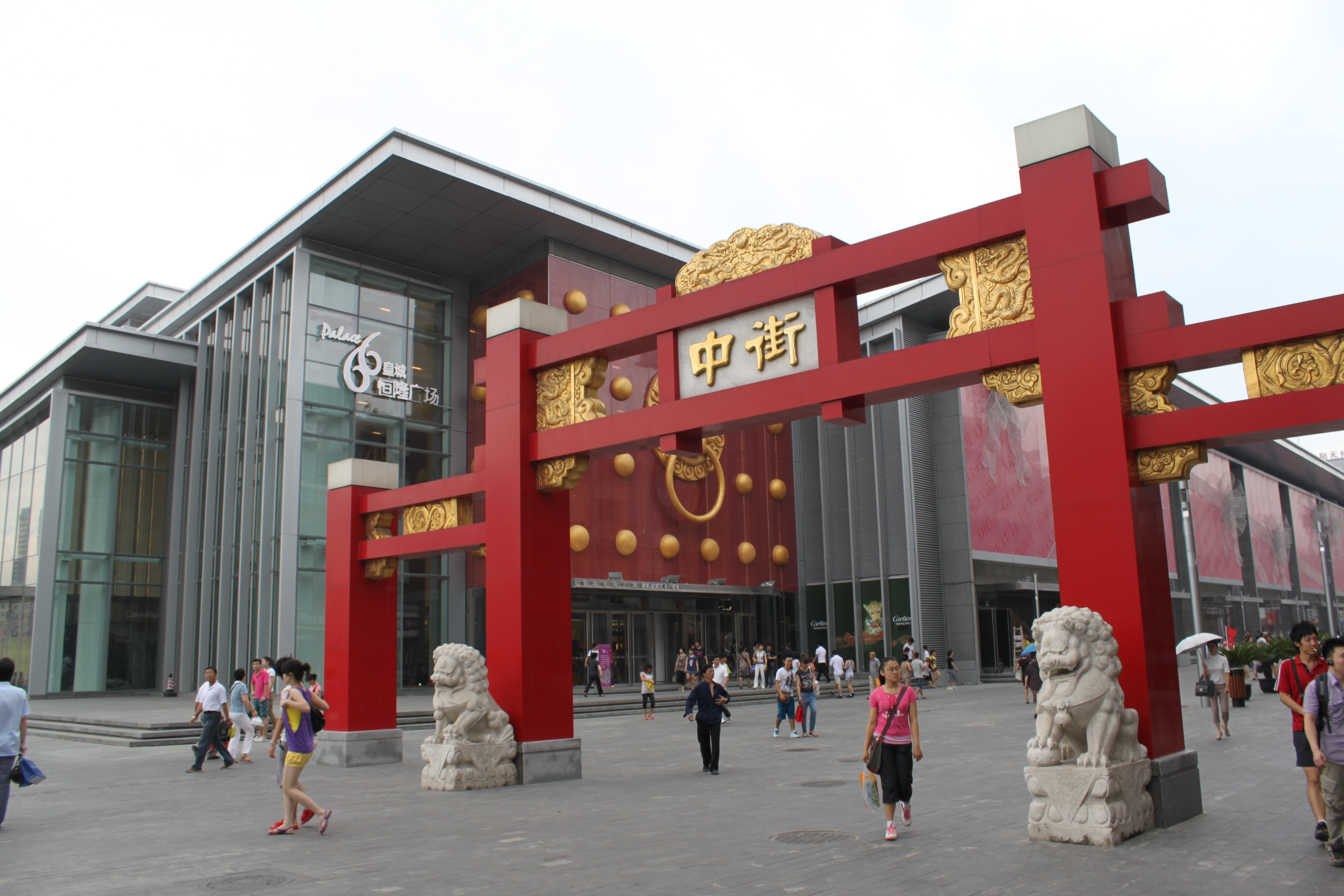
The arch entrance of Middle Street (Zhongjie), a 3.5 km-long pedestrian shopping strip in central Shenyang beside Mukden Palace, and is the longest shopping street in China.

Shenyang is an important industrial center in China and is the core city of the Shenyang Economic Zone, a New Special Reform Zone. It has been focused on heavy industry, particularly aerospace, machine tools, heavy equipment and defence, and recently on software, automotive and electronics. The heavy industry started in the 1920s and was well developed before the second world war. During the first five-year plan (1951–1956) many factories were built in Tiexi district. At its peak in the 1970s, Shenyang was one of the top three industrial centers in China alongside Shanghai and Tianjin, and was at one time being considered for upgrading to a direct-controlled municipality. However, as the planned economy fell out of favor after the 1980s, the heavy industry had declined gradually and the city became a rust belt city, with hundreds of thousands of people laid off from bankrupted state-owned factories. Nonetheless, the economy of the city has revived significantly in recent years, thanks to the central government's "Revitalize Northeast China" campaign and the rapid development of software and auto manufacture industries. Investment subsidies are granted to multinational corporations (MNCs) that set up offices or headquarters in Shenyang.

The services sector—especially banking—has been developing in Shenyang. Shenyang has several foreign banks, such as South Korea's Hana Bank, Japan's Bank of Tokyo-Mitsubishi UFJ, Hong Kong's Bank of East Asia, Singapore's United Overseas Bank and the Britain-based HSBC. In 2006, the city hosted a total of 1,063 banks and bank branches and 144 insurance-related companies. By 2010, it aims to attract 30 foreign banks and 60 non-bank financial institutions.

The city has been identified by the Economist Intelligence Unit in the November 2010 Access China White Paper as a member of the CHAMPS (Chongqing, Hefei, Anshan, Maanshan, Pingdingshan and Shenyang), an economic profile of the top 20 emerging cities in China.

Shenyang has three development zones:

- Shenyang Finance and Trade Development Zone
- Shenyang High-Tech Industrial Development Zone
- Shenyang Economic & Technological Development Zone

Numerous major industrial companies have their headquarters in Shenyang. Brilliance Auto is a major Chinese automobile manufacturer, and most of its production plants are also located in Shenyang. Shenyang Aircraft Corporation produces airplanes for civilian use as well as for the PLAAF. Neusoft Group is the biggest software company in China. Shenyang Machine Tool Group is the largest machine tool manufacturer in China. Tyco International, General Motors and Michelin Shenyang Tyre Corporation are expanding their operations in Shenyang.

The GDP per capita of the city of Shenyang is 78,490 yuan in 2009 (ranked 3rd out of all 58 cities and counties in Liaoning province).

== Transportation ==
As the transport hub of Northeast China, Shenyang is served by air, rail, a currently Five-line subway system and an extensive network of streets and expressways, with bus services throughout the city. Terminal 3 at Shenyang Taoxian International Airport is the largest terminal in northeast China. A new tram network system was built in the city's south in 2013.

=== Rail ===
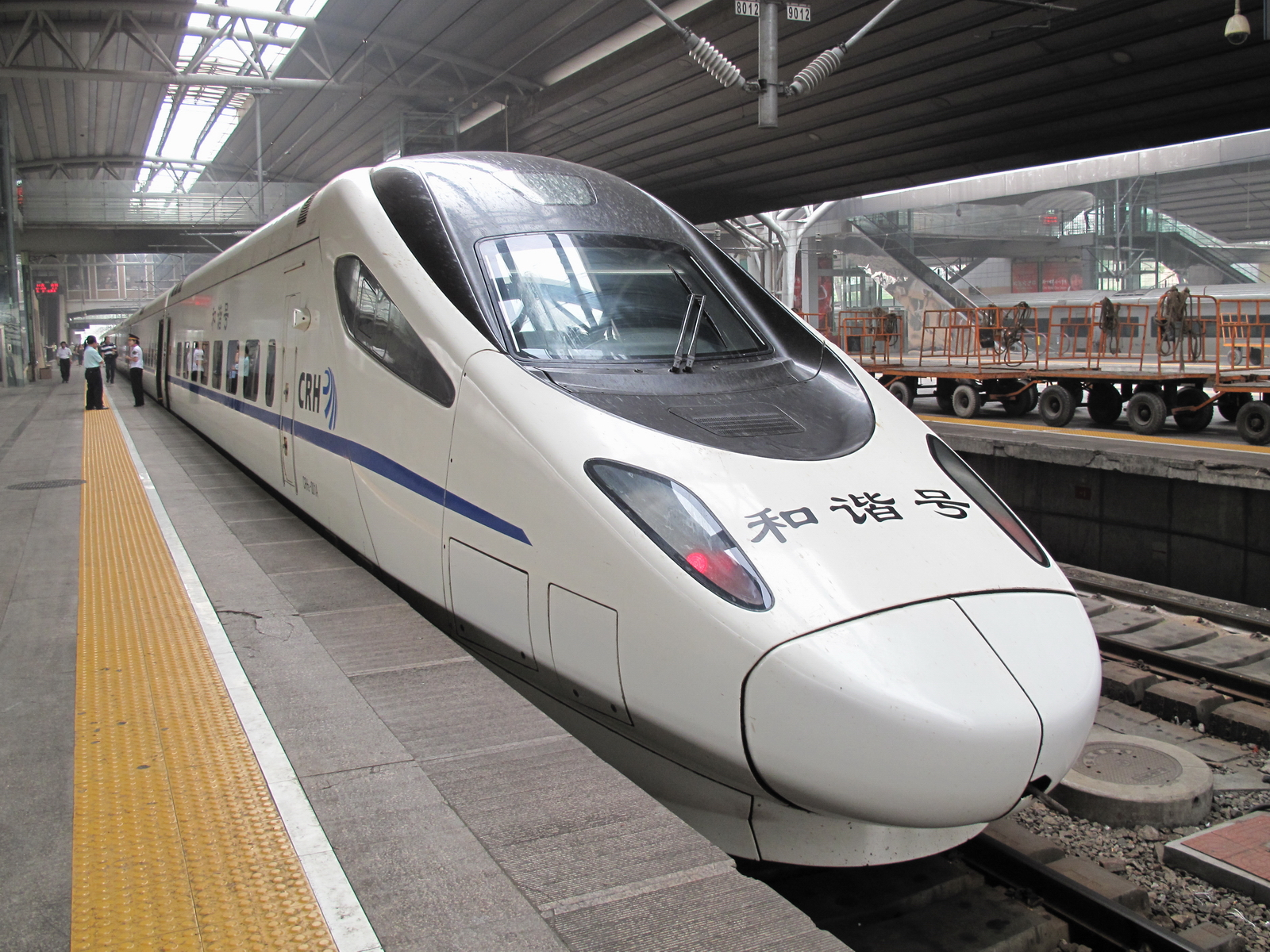
The CRH5-001A EMU serving the Beijing–Shenyang high-speed railway

Shenyang is the railway hub of Northeast China. Eight railways connect Shenyang with Beijing, Dalian, Changchun, Harbin and Fushun. The city is also served by the Qinhuangdao–Shenyang high-speed railway, the main passenger transport corridor in and out across the Shanhai Pass, and the first passenger-specific railway line in China. In early 2007, a 200 km/h (120 mph) high-speed train decreased travel time between Beijing and Shenyang by almost three-fold to around 4 hours. The Harbin–Dalian high-speed railway opened in late 2012 and connects Shenyang with other major cities in Northeast China such as Harbin, Changchun and Dalian at speeds of up to 300 km/h (190 mph).

Shenyang has two major railway stations: the Shenyang North railway station in Shenhe District, and the Shenyang railway station in Heping District.

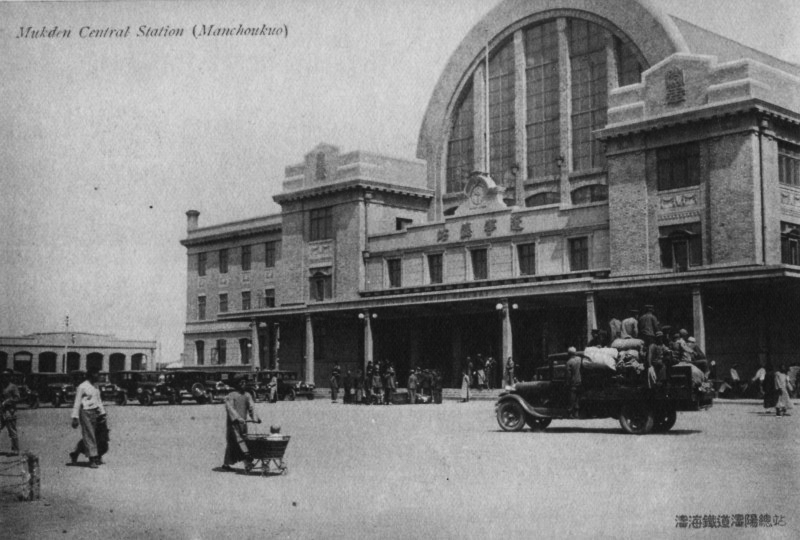
The old Liaoning General Station

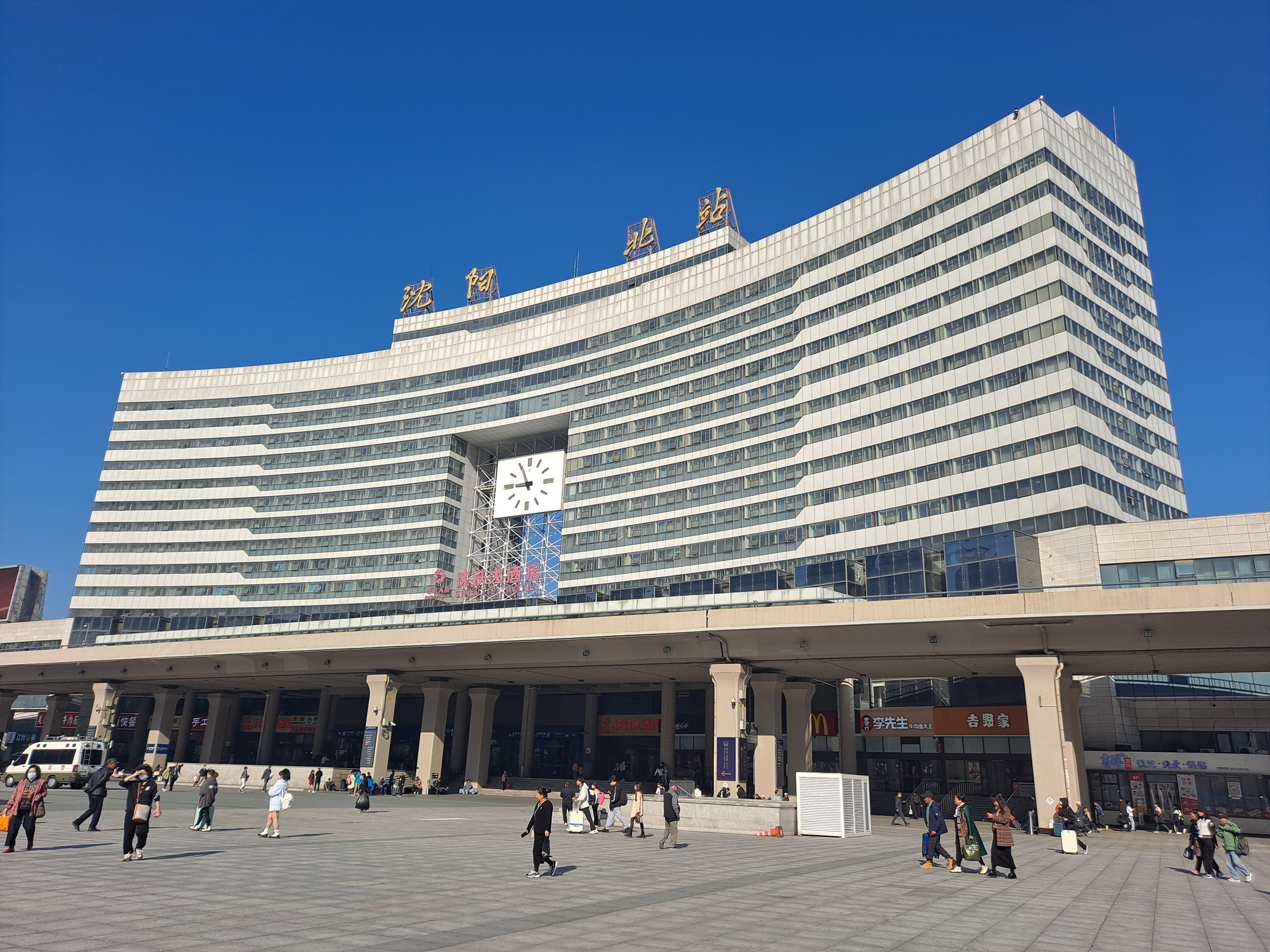
Shenyangbei Railway Station in 2024

The Shenyang North Railway Station (Chinese: 沈阳北站; pinyin: Shěnyáng Běi Zhàn) was formerly the Liaoning General Station (遼寧總站; Liáoníng Zǒngzhàn) before 1946, and colloquially known as the "Old North Station". The original station building (now an MHCSPNL-listed heritage building), initially named the Fengtian City Station (奉天城站; Fèngtīan Chéng Zhàn) at the time of completion, was built in 1927 at the terminal point of Jingfeng Railway, about 1 km (0.62 mi) southwest of the current station site, on the orders of warlord Zhang Zuolin to compete with the then Japanese-administered Shenyang Railway Station. The Main Station Building (主站房) of the current "New North Station" began construction in 1986 and was commissioned for operation in December 1990, and became one of the five most important railway hubs in China, earning itself the nickname "Northeast's No. 1 Station" (东北第一站). In 2011, a huge expansion project known as the "North Station Transport Hub Reconstruction Project" (北站交通枢纽改造工程) was initiated in response to the growing demand of floor area posed by the increasing passenger traffic after introduction of the high-speed rail service. The station now has an additional 3-storey "Sub-Station Building" (子站房) and a "North Square" (北广场) on the northern (Huanggu District) side of the railways, while the old waiting lounge in the original 16-storey Main Station Building is now relocated to a large elevated concourse that bridges over the rail tracks, with a pillar-less roof (the largest in mainland China) doming the platforms. The original South Square (南广场) outside the Main Station Building was rebuilt into a multi-levelled complex, with two above ground forming an elevated airport-style drop-off zone and a large ground-level area for bus stops, as well as a three-level underground city providing shopping malls, parking lots, taxi pick-up and interchange with Subway Line 2, while also capable of rapid conversion into an air raid shelter if needed.

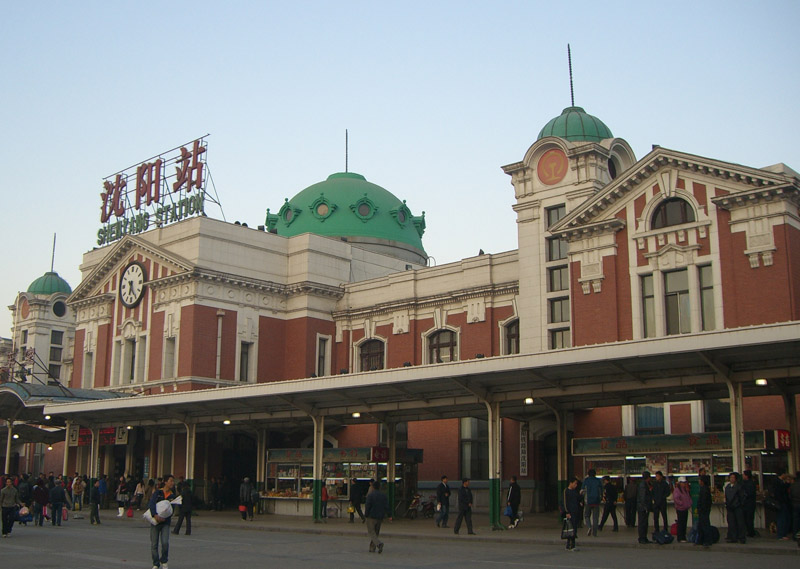
Shenyang Railway Station

The Shenyang Railway Station (Chinese: 沈阳站; pinyin: Shěnyáng Zhàn) has a history of more than 100 years. It was built by the Russians in 1899 on the eastern side of the South Manchurian Railway and was named the Fengtian Station (Chinese: 奉天站; pinyin: Fèngtiān Zhàn) at the time. It was later expanded by the Japanese after the Russo-Japanese War and renamed to Fengtian Yam (Chinese: 奉天驛; pinyin: Fèngtiān Yì) until the end of the World War II. Before adopting its current name, the station was known as the Shenyang South Railway Station (Chinese: 瀋陽南站; pinyin: Shěnyáng Nán Zhàn) or simply the "South Station" (in contrast to the forementioned "North Station") between 1945 and 1950, a name the locals still use colloquially to present days (though the current Shenyang South railway station is actually at the suburban junction between Hunnan and Sujiatun). Today, the station focuses on regular-speed passenger service and is being refurbished with a large archway and new terminal, reducing access to the boarding platforms by rerouting customers under and over ground while construction is completed. The station was expanded in 2010 with the addition of a new West Station Building (西站房) and a West Square (西广场) on the western side of the railways. The old East Station Building (东站房) is currently on the provincial protected heritage list.

Since 2011, a daily direct container rail service has carried automotive parts 11,000 km (6,800 mi) from Leipzig, Germany to Shenyang through Siberia with a 23-day transit time.

=== Road ===
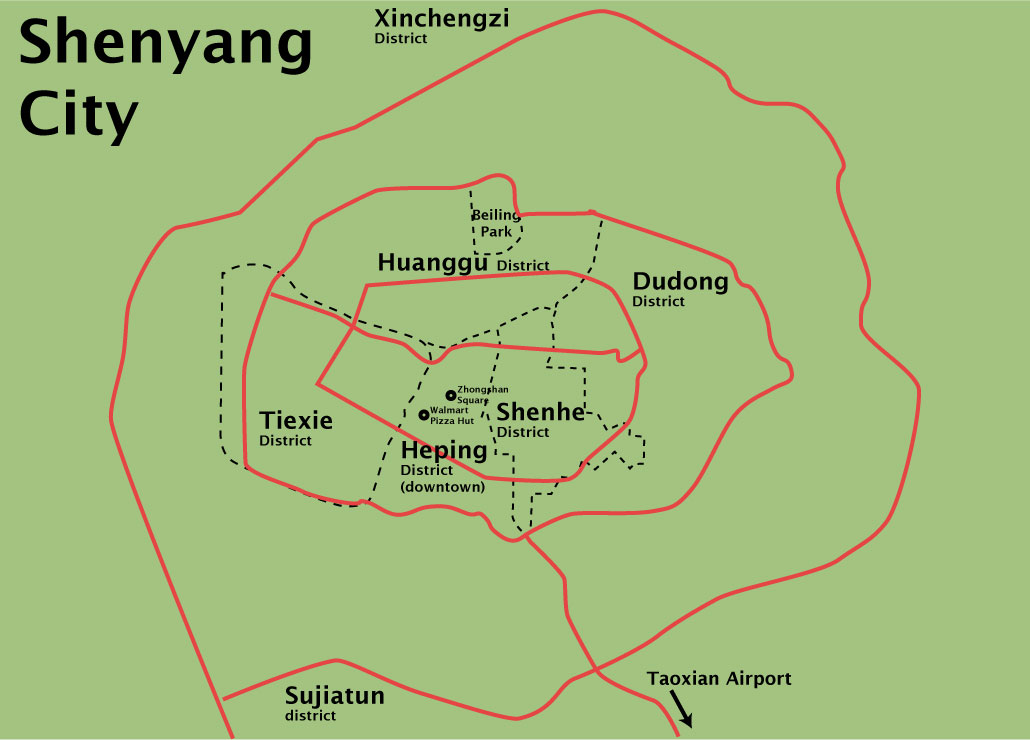
Shenyang's districts, landmarks and major roads

In the Manchukuo era, the initial road transportation network was laid out, as is now in the central districts of Shenyang. The city follows a largely grid-style urban layout, with the roads follow a slightly tilted northwest-to-southeast orientation due to the South Manchurian Railway, which runs perpendicular to that direction. The streets in Shenyang are almost always named according to a routine convention — one that runs more in the north–south direction is called a "street" (街; Jīe) or "avenue" (大街; Dà Jīe; 'big street'), and one that runs more east–west are call a "road" (路; Lù) or "boulevard" (大道; Dà Dào; 'big path'). The only exceptions to this rule are the east–west Middle Street in Shenhe District, which takes its historical name from ancient times (though its modern official name is actually the "Middle Street Road"); and the north–south Minzhu Road (民主路) in Heping District that traverses diagonally across the superblock between the Shenyang Railway Station and the Zhongshan Park, but as one of the only three diagonal streets in the entire city it is accommodated as a "road" instead of "street" in keeping with the other two diagonal counterparts that run east–west.

In addition to the grid streets, Shenyang also was developing several ring road systems, going back as early as the "Fengtian City Plan" (奉天都邑計劃) proposed by the Japanese-controlled puppet Manchukuo government in 1932. Outside of the (now demolished) city walls, the city initially planned three beltways, namely the "inner ring", "middle ring" and "outer ring" roads. Gradually with urban development, the inner ring idea faded away into the inner city grids, but the middle ring concept was retained and later transformed into the nowadays 1st Ring Road (一环路, officially called the "Middle Ring Road" until 1995), and the outer ring morphed roughly into parts of the present day 2nd Ring Road (二环路). The 3rd Ring Road (三环路) was completed in 1995, and in 2013 was upgraded into an 8-lane, 82 km (51 mi) freeway—the G15_{01} Shenyang Ring Expressway (沈阳绕城高速公路). The 10-lane, 132 km (82 mi) 4th Ring Road (四环路) is a limited-access highway about 8 km (5.0 mi) out from the 3rd Ring, completed in 2013. The planned 6-lane, 198 km (123 mi) 5th Ring Road (五环路) and the proposed 399 km (248 mi) 6th Ring Road (六环路), also known as the G91 Liaozhong Ring Expressway (辽中环线高速公路), are both currently under construction.

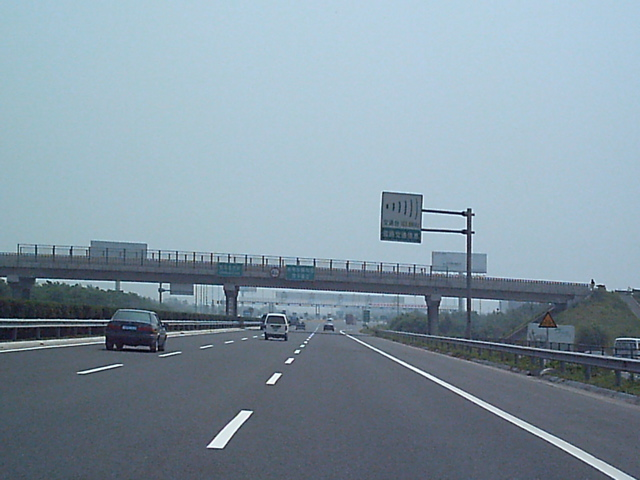
G1 Beijing-Harbin Expressway, Shenyang segment

Shenyang is connected to the other regions by several major expressways in radial pattern. The G15 Shenda Expressway (沈大高速公路) to the southwest is the first expressway built in China and is an 8-lane, 348.5 km (216.5 mi) controlled-access highway with a maximum speed limit of 120 km/h (75 mph), connecting Shenyang to Dalian, one of the largest port city in China. The 222 km (138 mi) Shendan Expressway (沈丹高速公路) to the southeast, part of the G11_{13} Dandong–Fuxin Expressway that traverses Shenyang from the northwest, is a 4-lane expressway leading to Benxi and Dandong, and also serves Shenyang Taoxian International Airport. The 4-lane G12_{12} Shenji Expressway (沈吉高速公路) to the east was completed in 2011, linking Shenyang to Jilin via Fushun. The 8-lane Jingshen Expressway (京沈高速公路) to the west is an integral part of the extended G1 Jingha Expressway (京哈高速公路) beyond the northeast, and is a major interprovincial "trunk road" across the Shanhai Pass linking to the national capital Beijing some 658 km (409 mi) away. There are other smaller provincial-level expressways ("S routes") to other cities like Fushun, Liaoyang and Panjin, as well as many long-distance and express bus routes to Beijing and other large Northeastern regional centers via major national roads such as the China National Highways 101, 102, 203 and 304.

=== Airport ===
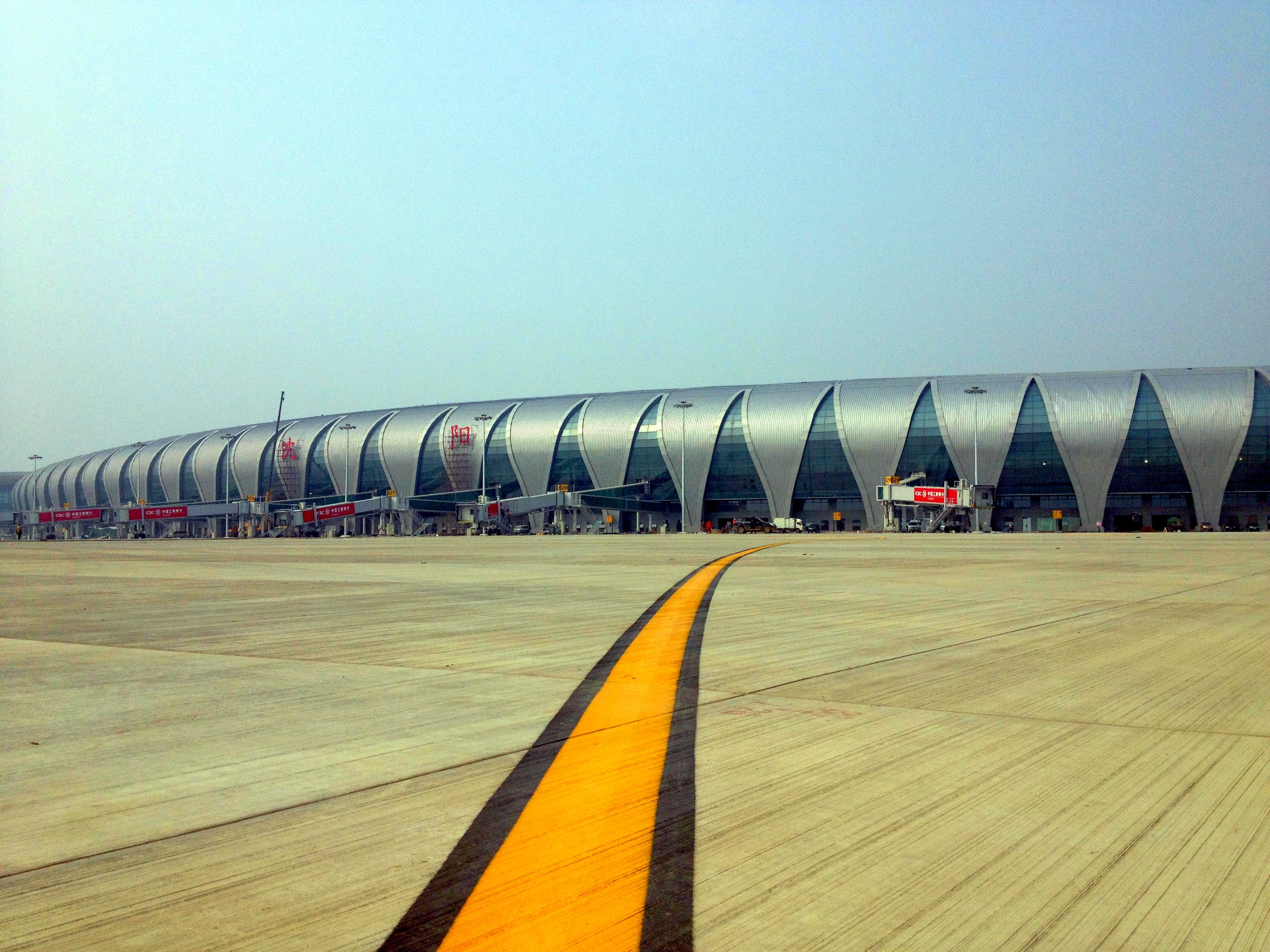
Taoxian International Airport

The city is served by the Shenyang Taoxian International Airport, located in Hunnan District. It is one of the eight major airline hubs and the 23rd busiest airport in China.

There are three other airports in Shenyang, none of them open to public. The East Pagoda Airport (东塔机场) in Dadong District is the oldest airport in Shenyang, opened in 1920s and retired in the 1980s, though there has been proposals in 2013 to relocate and reopen it in Xinmin. The Beiling Airport (北陵机场) in Huanggu District is used by Shenyang Aircraft Corporation for test flights. The Yuhong Airport (于洪机场) in Yuhong District is commissioned for military use only by the local Northern Theater Command garrisons.

=== Public transport ===
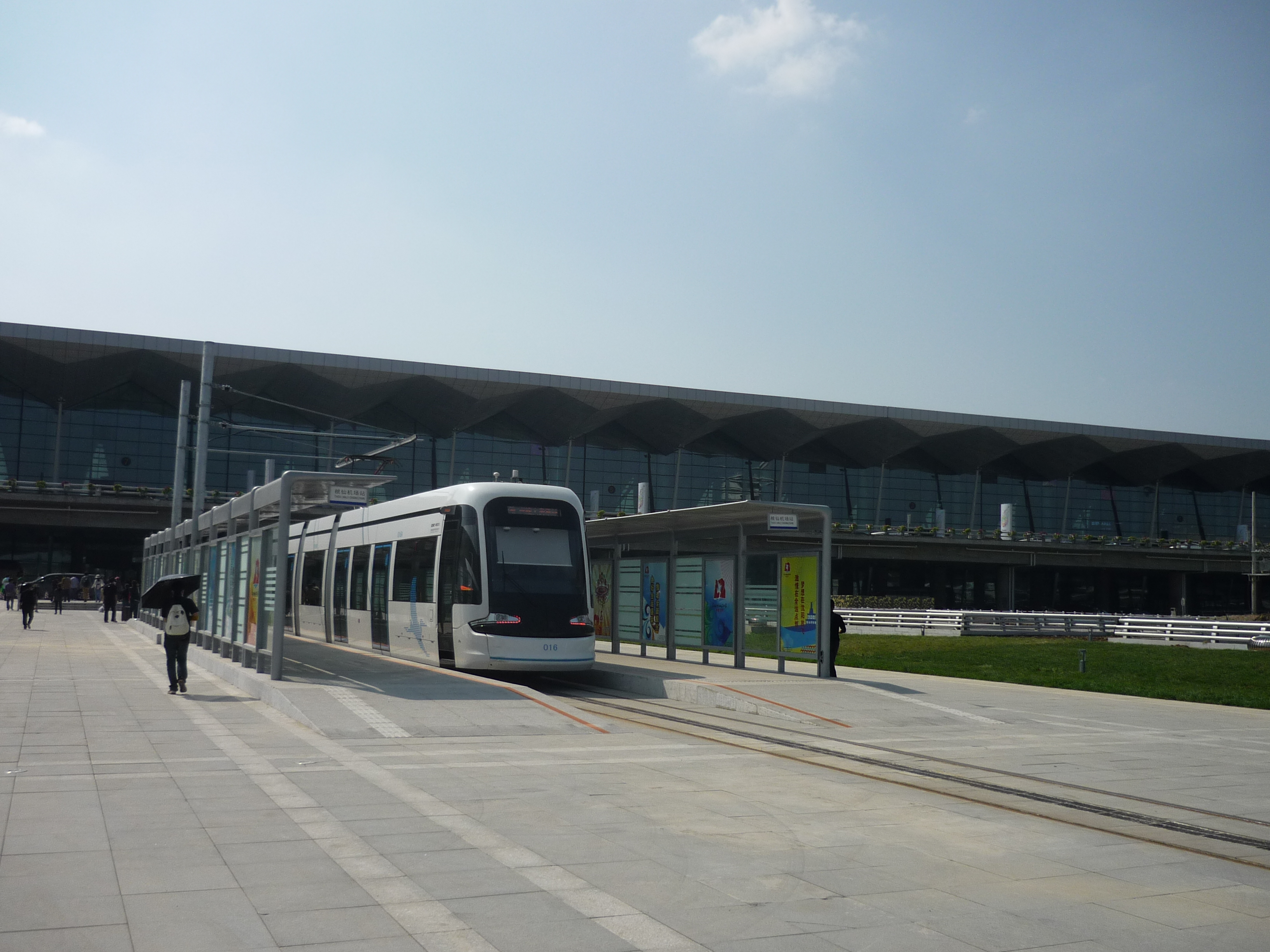
Hunnan Tram, a CRV 70% Low-Floor Tram serving Hunnan District

In Shenyang, there are more than 160 bus routes. Shenyang used to have about 20 trolley bus routes, one of the biggest trolley bus networks in China. The entire network was demolished in 1999 after a serious electrocution accident that killed 5 passengers on August 12, 1998, and was replaced by gas and diesel-powered buses.

Trams in Shenyang were introduced in 1924, and had 6 lines in operation up until 1945. It suffered major disruptions during the Chinese Civil War from power outage and Kuomintang bombings, but quickly resumed operation after the conclusion of the Liaoshen Campaign. After the establishment of the People's Republic of China, the tram network was gradually replaced by the buses and trolley buses, and eventually closed in 1974. In December 2011, the Shenyang city government announced plans to rebuild the light rail transit network in 2012, comprising 4 lines with 60 km (37 mi) distance in the Hunnan New District. The Shenyang Modern Tram network started operation on August 15, 2013.

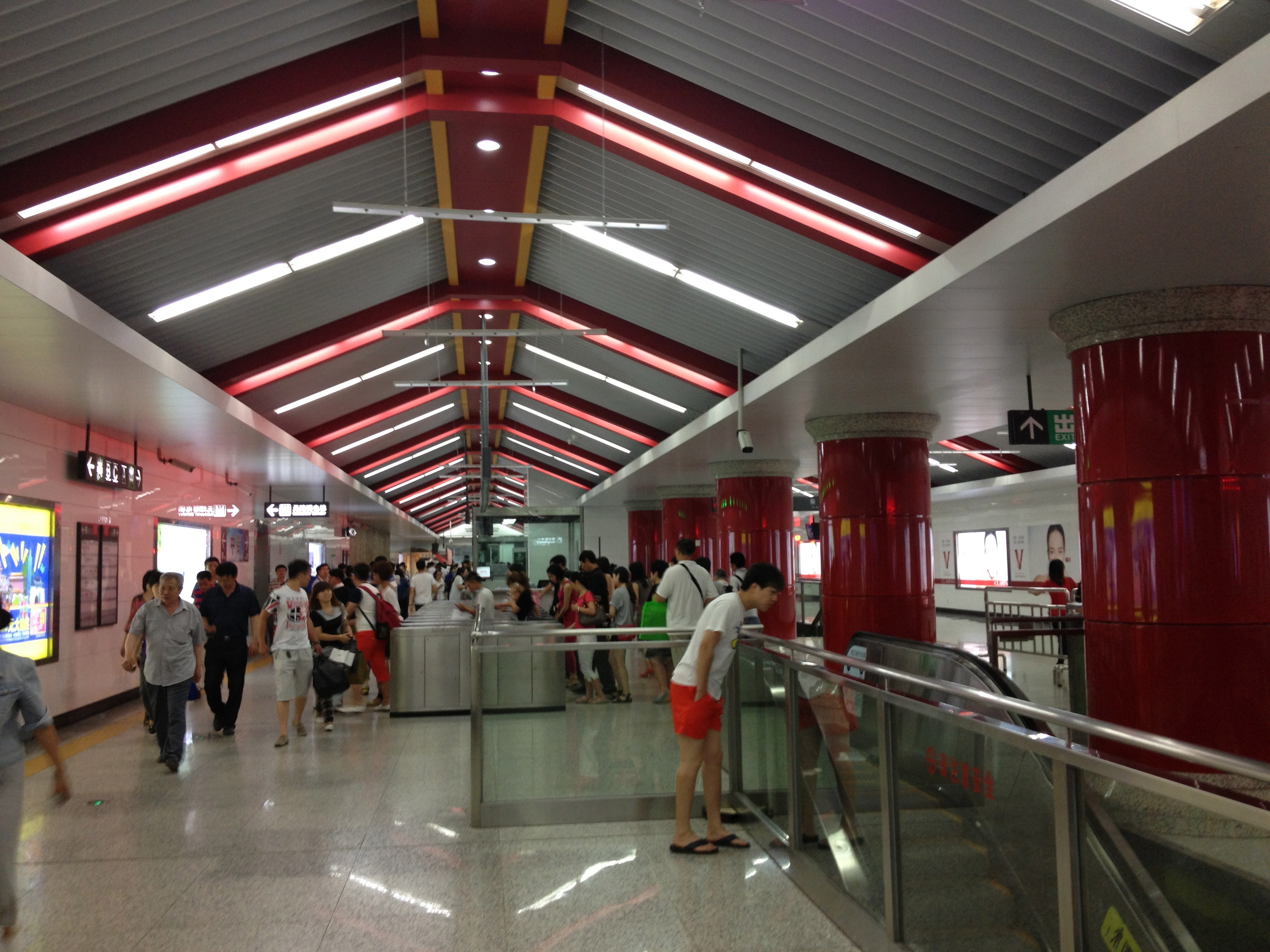
Shenyang Metro Line 1

Shenyang has been planning an underground rapid transit system since 1940, but was unable to materialize the idea due to the city's geology and engineering limitations. On November 18, 2005, the construction of the first Shenyang Metro line began and the construction of the second line started on November 18, 2006. The first (east–west) line was opened September 27, 2010, and the second (north–south) was opened on January 9, 2012. in 2023, the second line, running north to south, extended its southern portion to connect with the Shenyang Taoxian International airport. As of 2023, there are 5 running lines, with the latest of which (line 4) opening on September 29, 2023. Construction is difficult due to the granite-rich bedrock on which the city is built.

== Healthcare ==
Shenyang has 731 medical and healthcare centers, 63,000 healthcare staff and 3.02 healthcare worker per 1,000 people. There are 34,033 hospital beds and 45,680 various kinds of medical and technical personnel, among whom there are 17,346 licensed doctors, 1,909 assistant licensed doctors, and 16887 certified nurses. The average expected life-span of the people in Shenyang is 73.8 years.

The China Medical University (中国医科大学; Zhōngguó Yīkē Dàxué) in Huanggu District is one of the top 10 medical schools in China and is IMED-listed. Its diplomas are accredited worldwide.

Shenyang is home to China Medical University Hospital, China Medical University 1st, 2nd (renamed Shengjing Hospital in 2003) and 4th Affiliated Hospital, 202 Hospital, Liaoning Tumor Hospital, Shenyang No.7 People's Hospital, Shenyang Orthopaedics Hospital, Shenyang Army General Hospital, North Hospital, and various other hospitals and clinics.

== Military ==
Shenyang hosts the headquarters of the People's Liberation Army's Northern Theater Command (formerly the Shenyang Military Region) and garrisons its air force divisions.

Shenyang is also famous for its defense industries, with the Shenyang Aircraft Corporation (SAC), nicknamed "the cradle of Chinese jetfighters" (中国歼击机摇篮)", being the People's Republic's oldest and largest aircraft manufacturer, responsible for the design and manufacturing of the currently operational J-8, J-11, J-15, J-16 fighter aircraft and the in-development J-31 stealth aircraft. The Shenyang Aeroengine Research Institute, a subdivision of SAC, is also responsible for designing the indigenous WS-10, WS-15 and WS-20 turbofan engines.

In 2014, South Korea and China agreed to repatriate the remains of 400 People's Volunteer Army soldiers killed during the Korean War, which had been buried in Paju, and scheduled to be reburied in a state military cemetery in Shenyang.

== Culture ==
=== Shenyang dialect ===
People native to Shenyang speak the Shenyang dialect, a variant of Northeastern Mandarin. The dialect was formed in the early period of the Qing dynasty. It is similar to the other Northeastern dialects and also to the national standard of Mandarin, Putonghua, but is known as a form of Dongbeihua and has a wide range of vocabulary that is not part of the country's official language.

=== Art ===
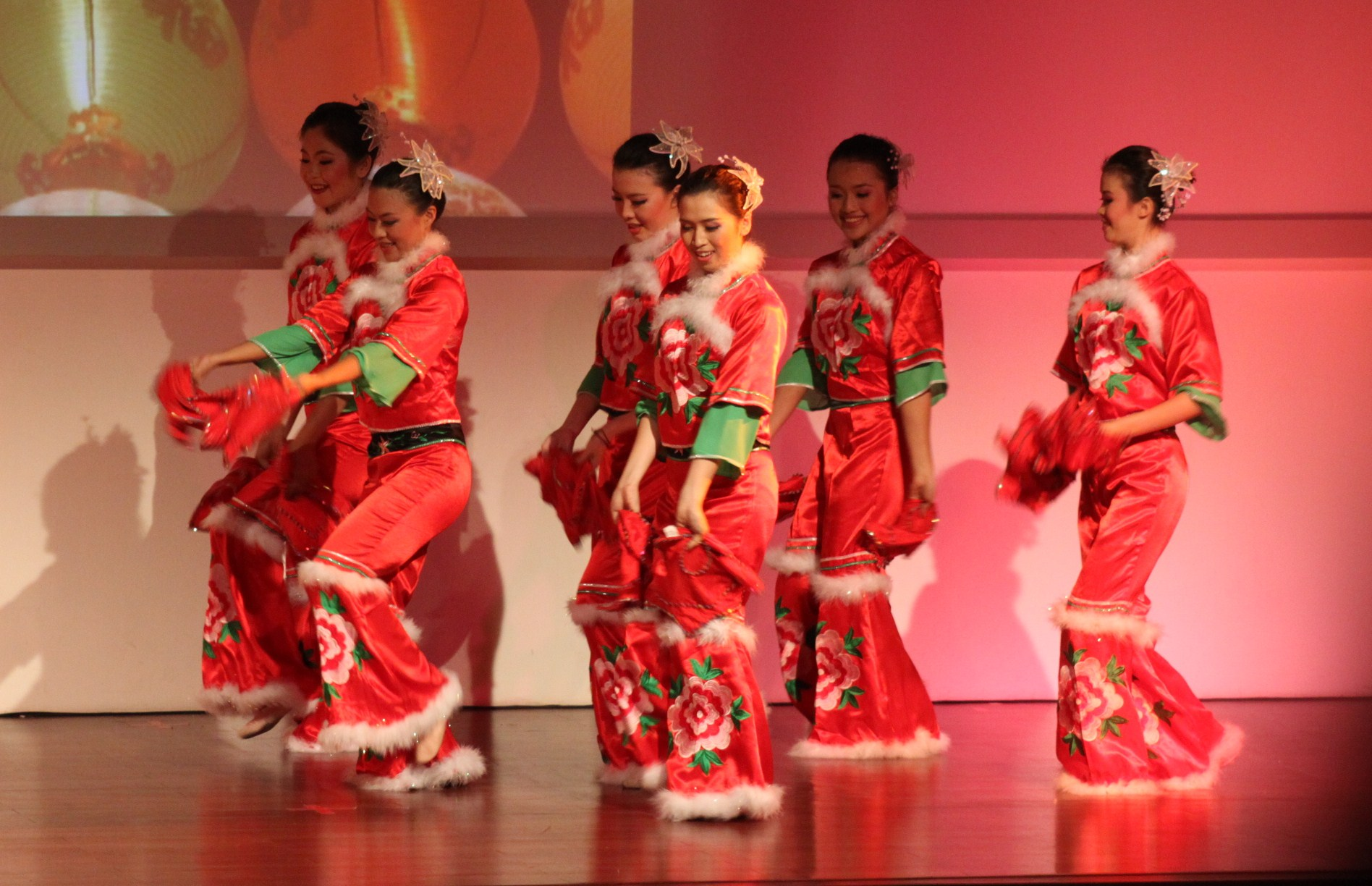
Yangge

Two northeast folk dances, Errenzhuan and Yangge, are very popular in Shenyang. The Big Stage Theatre (大舞台剧场) near Middle Street is famous for its Errenzhuan and Chinese comedy skit performances by Zhao Benshan and his students. Due to the popularity enjoyed by many Shenyang-based comedians, the city is nationally recognized as a stronghold of Chinese comedy.

Shenyang is home of many performance art organizations, such as Shenyang Acrobatic Troupe of China, Liaoning Song and Dance Ensemble, and Liaoning Ballet. Many artists are from Shenyang, such as Zimei, Na Ying and the pianist Lang Lang.

=== Museums ===
- Liaoning Provincial Museum (辽宁省博物馆), the largest museum in Northeast China. The museum holds many ancient relics and artefacts, including a selection of inscriptions in Chinese and Khitan that are some of the earliest known forms of writing.
- 9.18 Historical Museum (九·一八历史博物馆), a museum in memory of the Mukden Incident on September 18, 1931. The museum is in the shape of an opened calendar, and is located on the site where the Japanese troops destroyed the South Manchuria Railway, the prelude to the invasion of Manchuria.
- Xinle Relic (新乐遗址), located on the location where the Xinle civilisation was first discovered, containing a reconstructed Xinle settlement and housing artefacts discovered there.
- Shenyang Steam Locomotive Museum (沈阳蒸汽机车博物馆), with 16 steam engines from America, Japan, Russia, Belgium, Poland, Germany, Czechoslovakia and China.
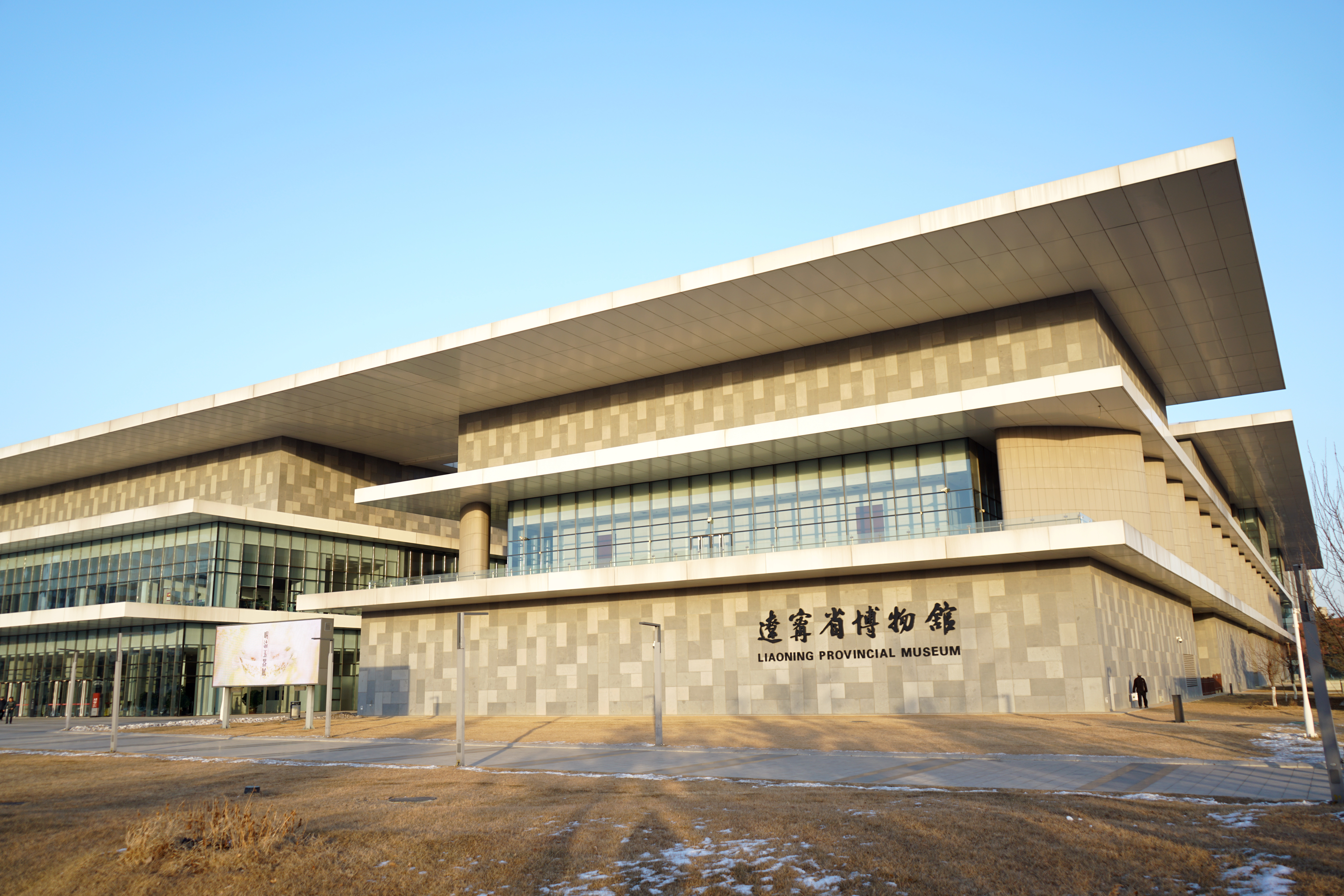
Liaoning Provincial Museum

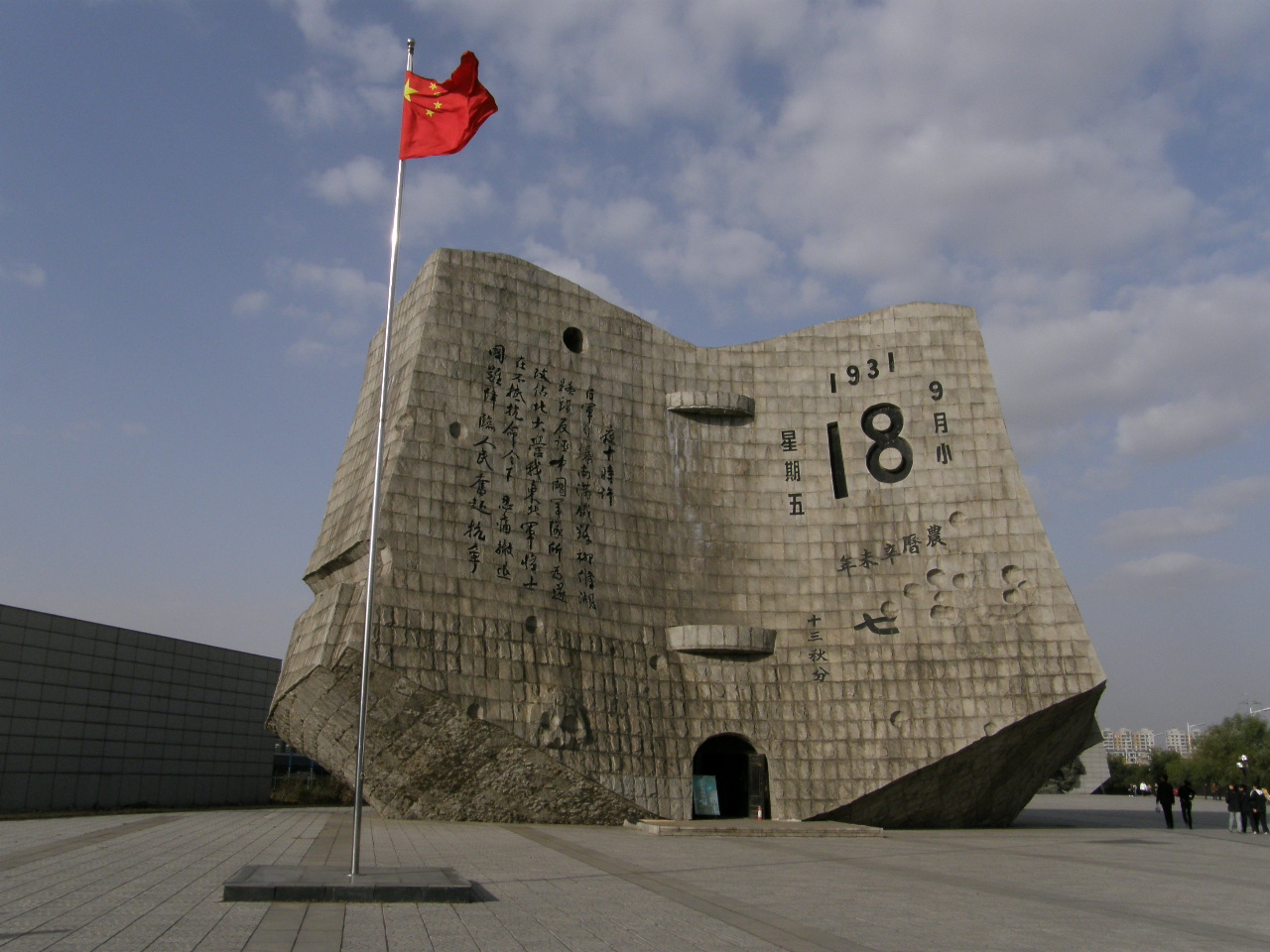
9.18 Historical Museum

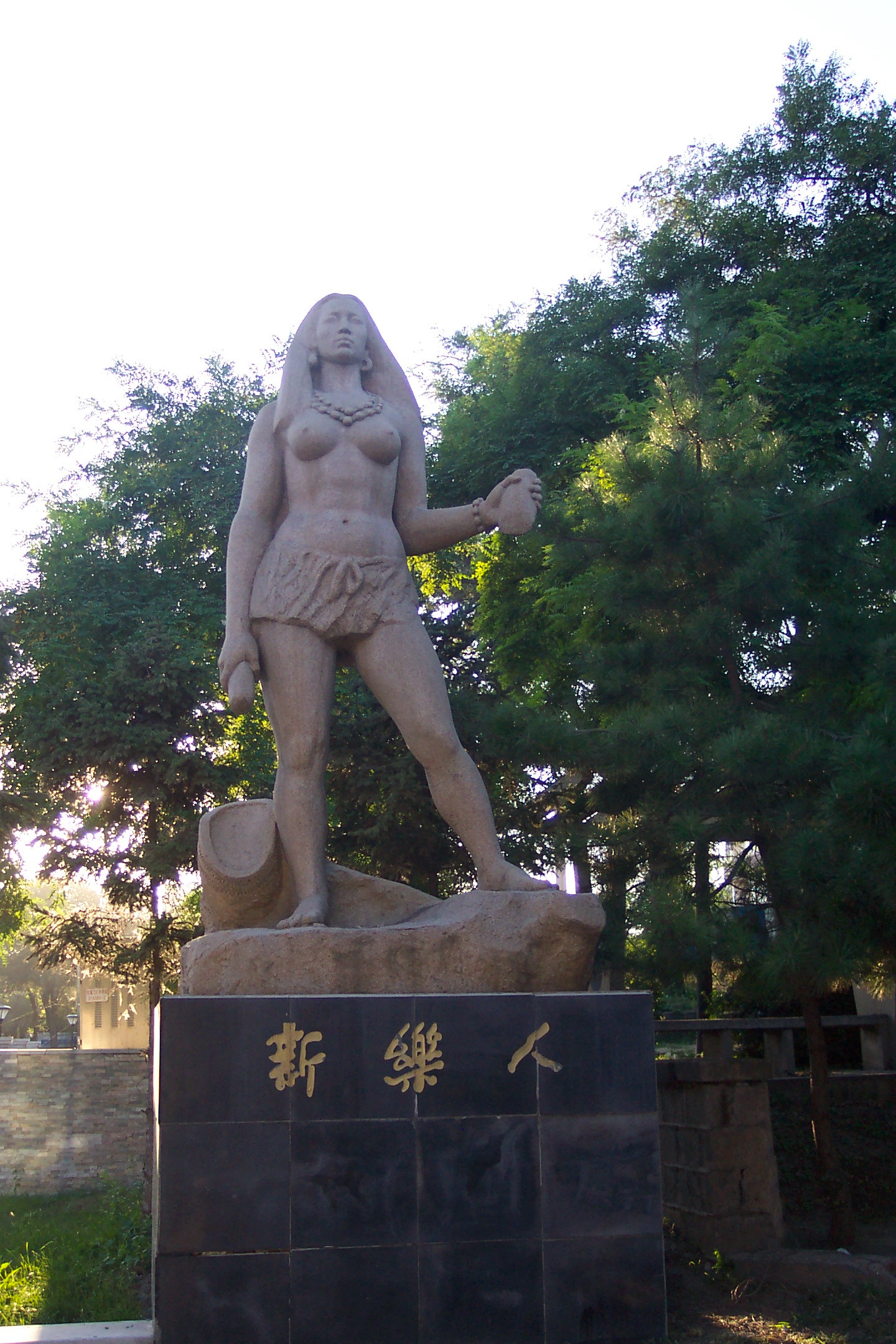
Xinle Relic

=== Sports ===
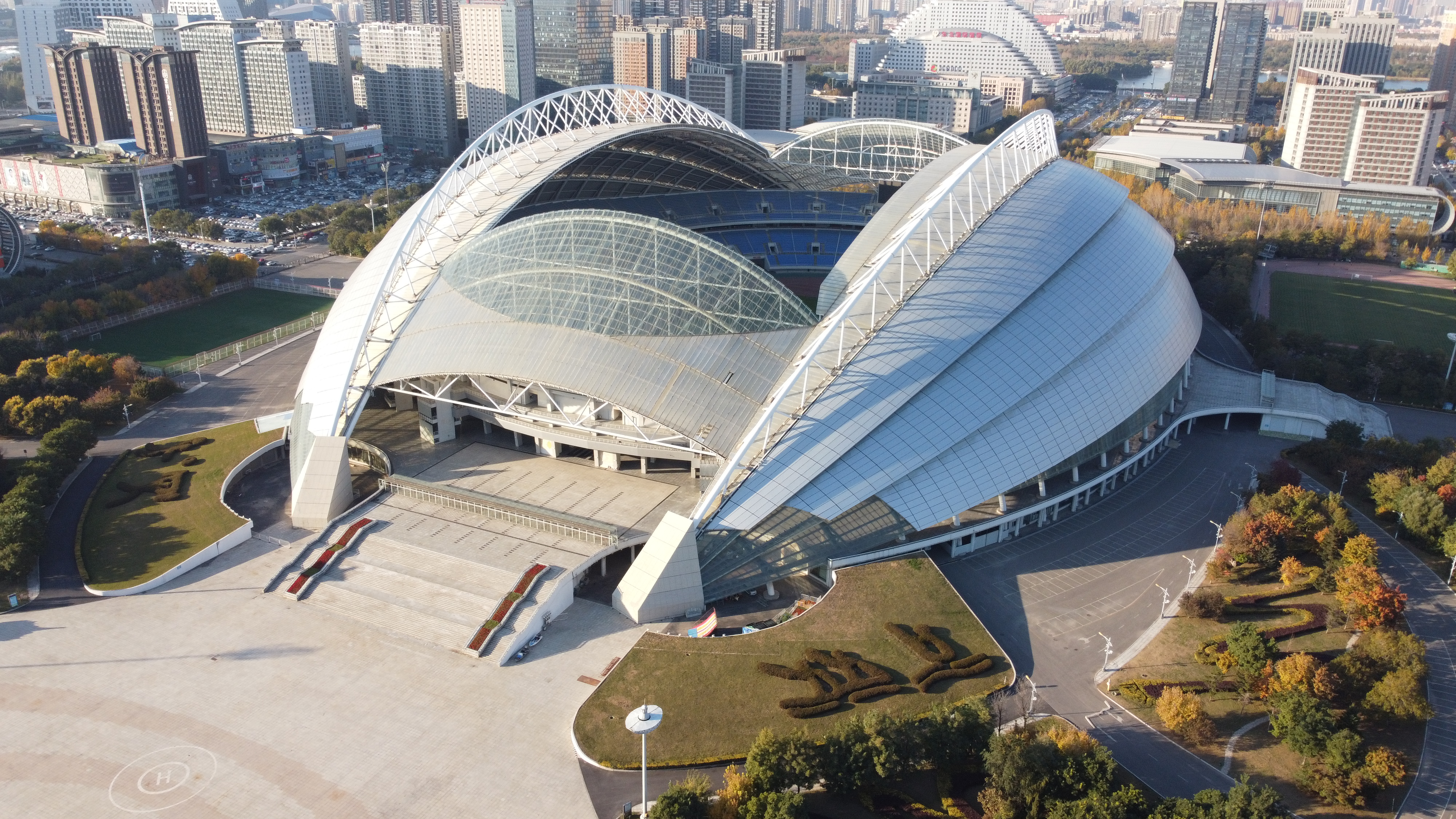
Shenyang Olympic Sports Centre Stadium

Shenyang is famous for its football tradition. The local football club, Liaoning F.C., who last played in the Chinese League One, dissolved in 2020. Liaoning F.C. was once the consecutive national champion for 10 years from 1984 to 1993, and the first Chinese team to win the AFC Champions League in 1990. Another Chinese Super League team, Shenyang Jinde moved to Changsha in 2007. Shenyang Olympic Sports Center Stadium, a 60,000-seated soccer stadium, was a venue for the football preliminary of 2008 Summer Olympics.

Shenyang also has one of the five full-length (400 m) speed skating rinks in China, the Bayi Speed Skating Arena (八一速滑馆).

Shenyang Sport University is a professional sports university, and acts as the training base for winter sports in China and has many Olympic champions.

=== Religion ===
The Shenyang city government, legally, recognizes five religious beliefs—Buddhism, Taoism, Islam and Christianity (Catholicism and Protestantism). During the period between 1949 and 1976, religious practices were significantly repressed, but have recovered since the end of the Cultural Revolution. As of 2012, Shenyang has seven city-level religious organizations, with 289 legally registered places of worship, 483 clerics and about 400,000 followers.

Famous religious sites include:

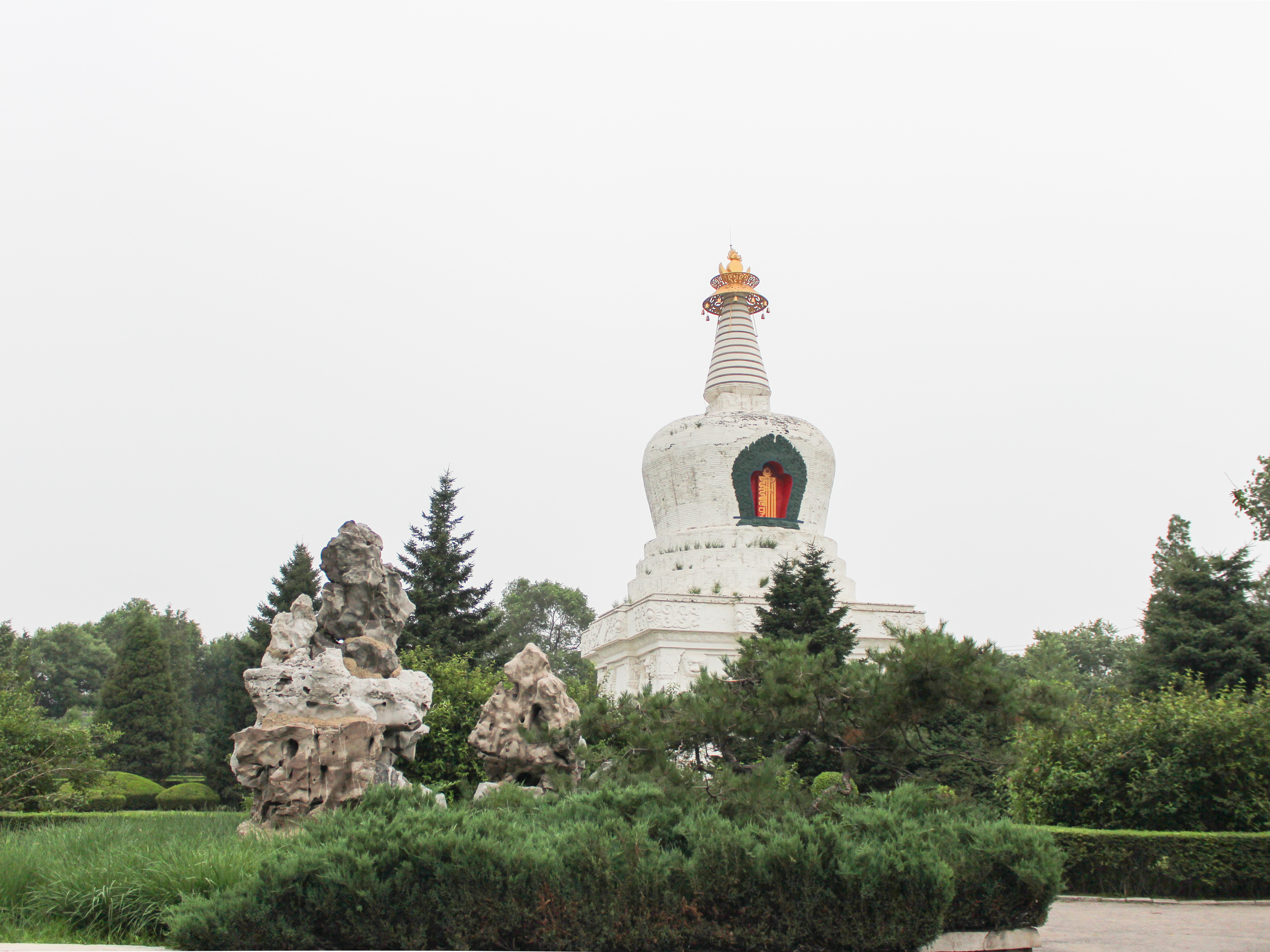
Shenyang East Pagoda

Buddhism

- Chang'an Temple (长安寺), a Zen Buddhism temple, first built during the Tang dynasty
- Bore Temple (般若寺), built during the Qing dynasty
- Ci'en Temple (慈恩寺), a Pure Land Buddhism temple,
- Wugoujingguang Śarīra Pagoda (无垢净光舍利塔), a 33-m-high Buddhist pagoda erected in 1044 during the Liao dynasty
- Shisheng Temple (实胜寺), once known as Imperial Temple (皇寺), a Tibetan Buddhist temple built in 1636 for the Qing royal family
- The East Pagoda (东塔), North Pagoda (北塔), West Pagoda (西塔) and South Pagoda (南塔), collectively known as the "Four Pagodas of Early Qing" (清初四塔; Qīngchū Sì Tǎ) are four white Tibetan Buddhist pagodas built by Hong Taiji in 1639.

Taoism

- Taiqing Palace (太清宫), built in 1663
- Pengying Palace (蓬瀛宫), the only female Taoist temple in Northeast China, built in 1994
- Doumu Palace (斗姆宫), formerly the second largest Taoist temple in Shenyang

Christianity

- Sacred Heart Cathedral of Shenyang (沈阳圣心教堂), a Roman Catholic cathedral
- Dongguan Church (东关教会), one of the largest and oldest Protestant churches in Northeast China, also known as the cradle of Christianity of the Koreans in China and in the Korean Peninsula
- Xita Church (西塔教会), a Protestant church for the Korean Chinese

Islam

- South Mosque (清真南寺), the largest mosque in Northeast China, built in Qing dynasty

=== Cuisine ===
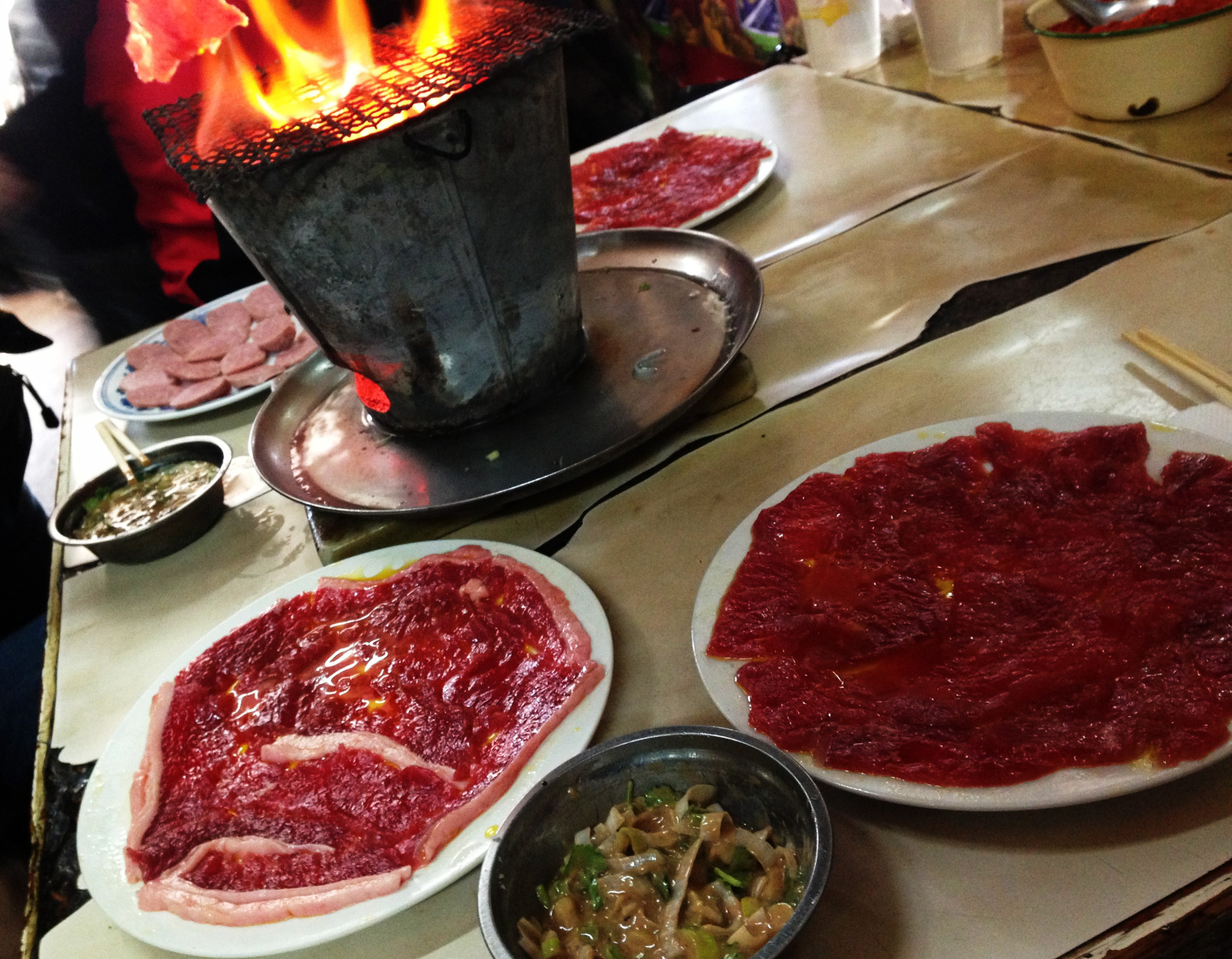
Korean-Chinese style barbecue in mud brazier (泥炉烧烤) is exclusively in Shenyang

Shenyang has classic northeastern Chinese cuisine. Traditional dishes in the region are suan cai (also called Chinese sauerkraut), stewed chicken and mushroom, and meat pie.The city is also particularly well-known for being the birthplace of kaojijia (烤鸡架), roasted chicken frames that developed from a locally popular inexpensive food into a characteristic part of Shenyang's street-food culture. Korean food, such as rice cake (Korean: 떡; RR: tteok) and cold noodle (Korean: 냉면; Hanja: 冷麵; RR: naengmyeon; Chinese: 冷面; pinyin: Lěng Miàn), is a part of Shenyangers' diet as there is a sizeable ethnic Korean population in the city, specifically in Nanta (Chinese: 南塔; pinyin: Nanta) Also, as the area was traditionally occupied by Manchus, the cuisine in Shenyang was fundamentally influenced by Manchu food, as well as the famous Manchu Han Imperial Feast.

Due to the sizeable Hui population in Shenyang, halal foods are a common and also enjoyed by non-Muslim people.

== Tourism ==
=== Attractions ===
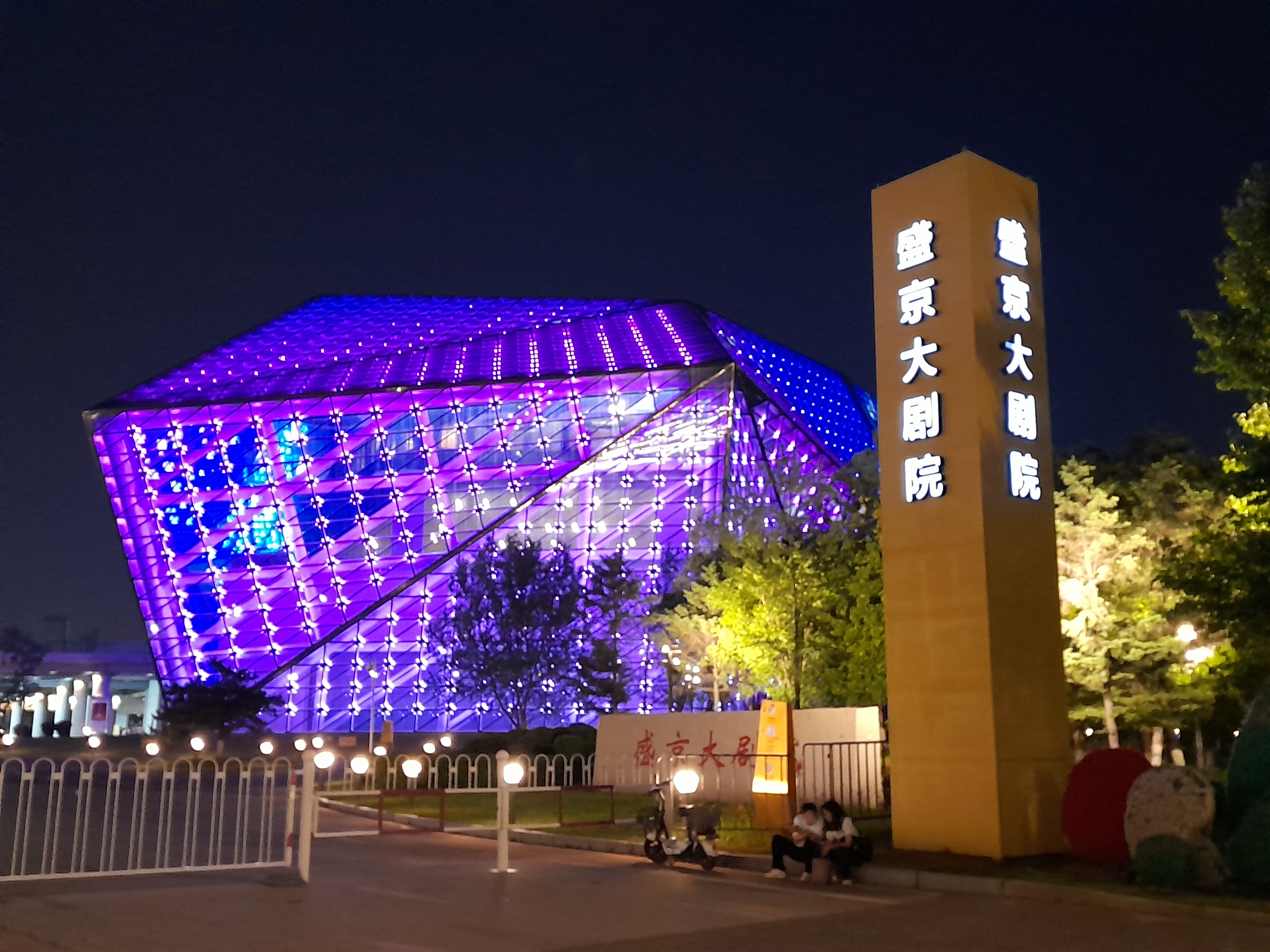
Shengjing Grand Theatre, Shenyang; also known as The Diamond

- Mukden Palace (沈阳故宫): the former imperial palace of the early Qing dynasty. It is a UNESCO World Heritage Site.
- East Mausoleum (东陵): the tomb of the first Qing emperor, Nurhaci. It is a UNESCO World Heritage Site.
- Beiling Park and North Mausoleum (北陵): the tomb of the second Qing emperor, Huang Taiji. The park covers an area of 3,300,000 square metres (36,000,000 square feet), and is serviced by trams for visitors who do not wish to (or cannot) traverse the length of the park. It is a UNESCO World Heritage Site.
- Qipan Mountain (棋盘山): a recreation resort in Shenbei New District, northeast of Shenyang.
- Strange Slope (怪坡): an 80 m (87 yd)-long, 25 m (82 ft)-wide slope on the western side of Mao Mountain in Shenbei District, famous for the unexplained phenomenon of vehicles seemingly able to move uphill unpowered.
- Shenyang Botanical Garden (沈阳植物园) is located within the Qipanshan Tourism District. With a total area of 2.46 km^{2} (610 acres), the garden hosted the International Horticultural Exposition in 2006. Since then it has also been known as the Shenyang International Expo Garden (沈阳世博园). A variety of botanical exhibitions are held throughout the year.
- Meteorite Mountain Forest Park (陨石山森林公园), located in the southeast of Shenyang in Hunnan District. The biggest meteorite lies on the Huashitai Mountain of Lixiang County, and is 160 m (520 ft) long, 54 m (177 ft) wide, 42 m (138 ft) tall and about 2,000,000 t (2,200,000 short tons) in weight. It is the oldest meteorite in the world which was formed 4.5 billion years ago and fallen into the Earth 1.9 billion years ago.
- Xiaonan Cathedral of Shenyang (小南天主教堂), the construction of the cathedral started in 1875 and finished in 1878.
- Qipanshan Tourism Development Zone

=== Shopping areas ===
Shenyang has many shopping areas that provide necessities, luxuries and entertainments. One of the shopping districts is Middle Street (中街). Middle Street has a history of more than 100 years. In 2005, Middle Street gained the title of China top 10 famous commercial shopping streets and in 2008; it won the International Golden Street title. Middle Street is also the first commercial pedestrian street in China. Middle Street features many western-style stores and restaurants. The largest shopping mall in Shenyang is also located on Middle Street, selling products from all around the world.

Taiyuan Street (太原街) is another shopping area which is similar to Middle Street. Taiyuan Street many restaurants and theaters for people to enjoy. Many spend their holidays shopping on these two streets. There is also a very large underground shopping center, offering many items, especially fashion jewelries, accessories and clothing.

Another area, Wu'ai Market (五爱市场), features a large multi-story shopping center with a size comparable to that of many city blocks. It is famous for wholesaling cheap clothes and household items.

The information technology center is in Sanhao street (三好街) in the southern part of the city. There are large superstores located throughout the city that sell everything from meat and dairy to clothes and electronics.

== Research and education ==
Shenyang is a major city for scientific research and education in Northeast China. Shenyang has one of the highest concentrations of educational institutes in China. Roughly 30 colleges and universities and numerous research and training institutions are located in Shenyang, including core institutes of the Chinese Academy of Sciences. As of 2025, it was listed among the top 100 science cities in the world as tracked by the Nature Index.

Research institutes

- Institute of Metal Research, Chinese Academy of Sciences (中国科学院金属研究所)
- Shenyang Institute of Automation, Chinese Academy of Sciences (中国科学院沈阳自动化研究所)
- Shenyang Institute of Applied Ecology, Chinese Academy of Sciences (中国科学院沈阳应用生态研究所), formerly the Institute of Forestry and Pedology (林业土壤研究所)
- Shenyang Institute of Computing Technology, Chinese Academy of Sciences (中国科学院沈阳计算机技术研究所)
- Shenyang Aircraft Design Institute (沈阳飞机设计研究所), also known as the "601 Institute"
- Shenyang Aeroengine Research Institute (沈阳发动机设计研究所), also known as the "606 Institute"

=== International schools ===
- Shenyang Transformation International School (沈阳国际学校), founded in 1998 by the International Schools of China (ISC), a United States non-profit organization committed to educational work in China.
- Shenyang Pacific International Academy (沈阳太平洋国际学校), located in Shenbei District. The school offers an American-style high school education.
- Canadian International School Shenyang (加拿大国际学校), located in Shenbei District, founded in 2017 with joint co-operation of AKD International Education and the Canadian government. The school offers a Canadian-style education ranging from kindergarten to middle school.
- QSI International School of Shenyang (QSI) (沈阳科爱赛国际学校 中国), founded in 2012 and located at Sekisui House, Hunnan New District

=== Universities ===
- China Medical University (中国医科大学)
- Liaoning University (辽宁大学)
- Liaoning Communication University (辽宁传媒学院)辽宁传媒学院
- Liaoning University of Traditional Chinese Medicine (辽宁中医药大学)
- Lu Xun Academy of Fine Arts (鲁迅美术学院)
- Northeastern University (东北大学)
- Shenyang Jianzhu University (沈阳建筑大学)
- Shenyang University (沈阳大学)
- Shenyang City University (沈阳城市学院)
- Shenyang Aerospace University (沈阳航空航天大学)
- Shenyang Agricultural University (沈阳农业大学)
- Shenyang Conservatory of Music (沈阳音乐学院)
- Shenyang Institute of Engineering (沈阳工程学院)
- Shenyang Ligong University (沈阳理工大学)
- Shenyang Medical College (沈阳医学院)
- Shenyang Normal University (沈阳师范大学)
- Shenyang Pharmaceutical University (沈阳药科大学)
- Shenyang Sport University (沈阳体育学院)
- Shenyang University of Chemical Technology (沈阳化工大学)
- Shenyang University of Technology (沈阳工业大学)

=== Defunct universities ===
- Fengyong University (馮庸大學) was the first private university in China to follow western teaching methods. It was established on August 8, 1927, with private funding by retired Fengtian clique major general Feng Yong (馮庸, 1901–1981, later re-enlisted as a ROCAF lieutenant general). It contained the departments of Engineering, Law and Education. After the Mukden Incident, the campus was looted by Japanese troops and converted into an aircraft repair camp. The staffs and students were later forced to evacuate to Beiping, where the university continued teaching for two more years before merging with the National Northeastern University in September, 1933. Many of the university's alumni were active members of anti-Japanese volunteer armies.

== International relations ==
=== Foreign consulates ===
Japan, Russia, South Korea, France, Germany, North Korea, Australia and the United States all have consulates in Shenyang, located in Heping District. These eight consulates make Shenyang the sixth major city to host more foreign representatives than any other city in China after Beijing, Shanghai, Guangzhou, Chengdu, and Chongqing.

=== Twin towns – Sister cities ===
Shenyang has established sister/friendship city relationships with many other cities around the world. These relationships have sought to promote economic, cultural, educational and other ties.

Sister cities

- Sapporo, Hokkaido, Japan 1980
- Kawasaki, Kanagawa, Japan 1981
- Turin, Italy 1985
- Chicago, United States 1985
- Irkutsk, Russia 1992
- Quezon City, Philippines 1993
- Ramat Gan, Israel 1993
- Gongju, South Chungcheong, South Korea 1996
- Chuncheon, Gangwon Province, South Korea 1998
- Seongnam, Gyeonggi, South Korea 1998
- Yaoundé, Cameroon 1998
- Ho Chi Minh City, Vietnam 1999
- Gumi, North Gyeongsang, South Korea 1999
- Thessaloniki, Greece 2000
- Ostrava, Czech Republic 2006
- Katowice, Poland 2007
- Hamamatsu, Shizuoka, Japan 2010
- Ufa, Bashkortostan, Russia 2011
- Novosibirsk, Russia 2013
- Incheon, South Korea 2014
- La Plata, Argentina 2014
- Belfast, Northern Ireland 2016

Friendship cities

- Pittsburg, California, United States
- Düsseldorf, Germany
- Marabá, Pará, Brazil
- New York City, United States

== In media ==
The decline of Shenyang's Tiexi district in the 1990s was recorded by director Wang Bing in the film Tie Xi Qu: West of the Tracks.

== See also ==
- List of cities in the People's Republic of China by population
- Unit 100
- List of twin towns and sister cities in China
- SYTV
- List of universities and colleges in Shenyang
