= Li Jiangang =

Chinese plasma physicist

- 李建刚
- Born: November 3, 1961 (age 64); Hefei, Anhui, China
- Education: Harbin Engineering University
- Scientific career
- Fields: plasma physics
- Workplaces: University of Science and Technology of China, Hefei Institutes of Physical Science

Li Jiangang (Chinese: 李建刚; born 3 November 1961) is a Chinese plasma physicist. He is a research fellow at the Hefei Institutes of Physical Science and a professor of the University of Science and Technology of China (USTC). He formerly served as Vice President of USTC and Director of the Institute of Plasma Physics, Chinese Academy of Sciences. He was elected an academician of the Chinese Academy of Engineering in 2015.

Li was born in Hefei, Anhui, China. He graduated from Harbin Engineering University in 1982. He earned his master's degree in 1985 and Ph.D. in 1990, from the Institute of Plasma Physics, Chinese Academy of Sciences. He is an editor of peer-reviewed journals including Plasma Science and Technology and Nuclear Fusion.
