= He Yizhen =

Chinese physicist

- Born: 1910
- Died: 2008 (aged 97–98)
- Education: Ginling College; Mount Holyoke College; University of Michigan Ann Arbor
- Spouse: Ge Tingsui
- Children: Ge Yunpei, Ge Yunjian
- Scientific career
- Fields: Amorphous State Physics
- Workplaces: Beijing Normal University; Chinese Academy of Sciences

He Yizhen (Chinese: 何怡贞; pinyin: Hé Yízhēn; Wade–Giles: Ho I‑chên; 1910–2008) was a Chinese physicist. She contributed to applying spectroscopy to the steel industry in China and to the research in amorphous state physics. Her research specialty in amorphous physics was metallic glass. She filled up the blank of spectroscopy research in China, and became the first person to measure the whole internal friction peak of metallic glass. He Yizhen was one of the founders of the Institute of Solid State Physics of the Chinese Academy of Sciences in Hefei. The research emphases of the institute are nuclear engineering, special metallic materials, and internal friction of solid.

== Early life ==
He Yizhen was born to a scholarly family as the eldest child in 1910, shortly before the Qing dynasty, the last dynasty of China, was overthrown. Her father, He Cheng, participated in the Xinhai Revolution which overthrew the Qing Dynasty and led to the founding of the Republic of China, in 1912.

He was born during a time when foot binding was still common, however her grandmother, Wang Xiechangda, was an open-minded educator and social activist for women's rights, who became a prominent influence in He Yizhen's life. Wang believed that women should go to school and argued against bound feet, and established Zhehua School, where Yizhen, along with her seven brothers and sisters, graduated from.

She had seven siblings: He Zeming, He Zehui, He Zerong, He Zeying, He Zeyuan, He Zecheng, and He Zeqing. All eight of the brothers and sisters became scientists. Yizhen, Zehui, and Zeying are known as the "Three He sisters" in some Chinese scientific circles.

== Education ==
He Yizhen graduated at Zhenhua Girls School in 1926 and subsequently attended Ginling College, where she studied Mathematics and Physics. Following her graduation from Ginling College in 1930, she taught at a missionary school for one year. She obtained a Master's degree in Chemistry and physics from MHC in 1933. Though He had intended to return to China after her graduation, her mentor recommended her to pursue a higher degree. She received a doctorate in physics from the University of Michigan Ann Arbor in 1937 and was awarded Barbour scholarship, which was especially built for Asian women. In her Ph.D. research, He focused on spectroscopy of transition metals.

== Career ==
He returned to China in 1937, at the start of the Second Sino-Japanese War. Her family moved from Suzhou to Beijing. Because of her father's close friendship with the principal of Yenching University, He obtained a position there as a lecturer. In 1939, she left Beijing and took a position as lecturer in Donghao University in Shanghai.

After her marriage to Ge Tingsui in 1941, He returned to the United States with her husband. Through her previous academic connections, she was recommended for a position at a college and eventually became a research assistant to Dr. Ralph A. Beebe at Amherst College. Her research topic was the measurement of thermal adoption in chemistry, rather than spectroscopy. Because she was pregnant, she only stayed in the position for several months and focused on raising her children, who were born in 1942 and 1947. She also worked for briefly at Massachusetts Institute of Technology and Metal Research Institute of the University of Chicago. He returned to China in 1949, after founding of the People's Republic of China, and became a professor at Yenching University.

From 1952, He founded and worked at the Institute of Metal Research at the Chinese Academy of Sciences. Her research focused on improving the production rate of China's nascent steel industry through the application of spectroscopy to alloy steel and slag analysis in steel industry and solved issues in steel production. She published two representative papers: "Effect of Microstructure of Steel on Spectral Analysis" and "Cup Electrode Solution Arc Method for Spectral Analysis of Open Hearth Slag".

From 1966 to 1976, He's research was interrupted by effects of China's Cultural Revolution. She was forced to endure humiliating punishments as a result of her experience studying abroad and her wealthy background. In 1969, she was dispatched to the rural area Panjin to labor for two months as punishment.

When the Cultural Revolution of China ended in 1976, He continued her theoretical research. She published two formative papers: "Effect of the Isothermal Effectiveness Near the Peak of the Metallic Glass Pd80Si20Tg", and "A New Peak Near Metallic Glass T". Her papers won the Second Class Prizes of The State Scientific and Technological Progress Award of the Chinese Academy of Science in 1988. She would go on to win the Third Class Prizes of The Natural Science Award of Chinese Academy of Science in 1995 and 1996 and was involved in compiling the book, Amorphous Physics.

In October 1982, she became one of the founders of Institute of Solid State Physics, Chinese Academy of Science.

== Personal life ==
In 1941, He Yizhen married Ge Tingsui, an expert in nuclear physics. Ge later became a leading researcher at the Institute of Metal Research and Institute of Solid State Physics. They developed a competitive relationship with one another due to their studies in the same field.

The couple met at Yenching University, where He had been a lecturer and was three years older than Ge. Because He came from a wealthy and influential family, she had a number of admirers; her family did not approve of her relationship with Ge became he came from a poor family and also suffered from pulmonary tuberculosis, for which a valid treatment was not available at the time. Furthermore, Ge's political beliefs clashed with He's father, who disagreed with Ge's support of the political activism of students. In opposition to her family's wishes, she married Ge; their marriage became a much-told tale in Chinese academic world and their love letters are still preserved in their biographies.

After their marriage, Ge obtained the opportunity to study in the United States with He, where they remained from 1941 to 1949. Their two children were born in the United States and eventually became scientists: their daughter Ge Yunpei (1942-2013) was a professor in Shenyang Jianzhu University, while their son Ge Yunjian (born 1947), is an expert in robotics. The couple returned to China in 1949, where they both worked for the Chinese Academy of Science for decades. When Ge was dispatched to work in Hefei in 1980, He's husband and children persuaded her to stop her research to join him in Hefei.

== Publications (after 1980) ==
- Ding, Xingzhao; Liu, Lin; Ma, Xueming; Qi, Zhenzhong; He, Yizhen (1994). "The influence of alumina dopant on the structural transformation of gel-derived nanometre titania powders". Journal of Materials Science Letters. 13 (6): 462–464. doi:10.1007/BF00278028. S2CID 93526077.
- Yizhen, He; Xiao-Guang, Li (1987-01-16). "A new type of internal friction peak of metallic glasses near Tg". Physica Status Solidi A. 99 (1): 115–120. Bibcode:1987PSSAR..99..115Y. doi:10.1002/pssa.2210990114. S2CID 98303934.
- Yue, Lanping; He, Yizhen (1997-03-15). "Studies on room temperature characteristics and mechanism of visible luminescence of Ge-SiO_{2} thin films". Journal of Applied Physics. 81 (6): 2910–2912. Bibcode:1997JAP....81.2910Y. doi:10.1063/1.363963.
- Yue, Lanping; He, Yizhen (1997-03-15). "Studies on room temperature characteristics and mechanism of visible luminescence of Ge-SiO_{2} thin films". Journal of Applied Physics. 81 (6): 2910–2912. Bibcode:1997JAP....81.2910Y. doi:10.1063/1.363963.
- Yue, Lanping (September 1997). "Visible photoluminescence of Ge nanocrystallites embedded in SiO_{2} thin films". Journal of Vacuum Science & Technology B: Microelectronics and Nanometer Structures. 15 (5): 1607–1609. Bibcode:1997JVSTB..15.1607Y. doi:10.1116/1.589556.
- Xiao-guang, Li; Yizhen, He (1986-06-16). "Internal friction of metallic glass Ni_{74}P_{16}B_{6}Al_{4} near T_{x}". Physica Status Solidi A. 95 (2): 467–472. Bibcode:1986PSSAR..95..467X. doi:10.1002/pssa.2210950214.
- Xingzhao, Ding; Ju, Luo; Zhenzhong, Qi; Yizhen, He (February 1995). "Effect of Hydrolysis Catalysts on Structural Evaluation of Sol-Gel Derived Titania Nanocrystalline Powders". Chinese Physics Letters. 12 (2): 123–125. Bibcode:1995ChPhL..12..123D. doi:10.1088/0256-307x/12/2/017. S2CID 250823163.
- Tu, Pa; Yizhen, He (1980-05-16). "Motion of dislocations from an indentation rosette on silicon crystals". Physica Status Solidi A. 59 (1): 195–200. Bibcode:1980PSSAR..59..195T. doi:10.1002/pssa.2210590125.
- Li, Zongquan; Qin, Yong; He, Yizhen (1995-04-16). "Metastable phases formed at the initial stage of crystallization for the metallic glass Pd_{80}Si_{20}". Physica Status Solidi A. 148 (2): 351–362. Bibcode:1995PSSAR.148..351L. doi:10.1002/pssa.2211480203.
- Ding, Xingzhao; He, Yizhen (1988-12-16). "A study of structural relaxation in glassy Pd_{77.5}Cu_{−6.0}Si_{−16.5} by microcalorimetric measurements". Physica Status Solidi A. 110 (2): K67–K71. Bibcode:1988PSSAR.110...67D. doi:10.1002/pssa.2211100244.
- Zongquan, Li; Yizhen, He (1986-11-16). "Crystallization of Metallic Glass Pd_{80}Si_{20}". Physica Status Solidi A. 98 (1): 91–105. Bibcode:1986PSSAR..98...91Z. doi:10.1002/pssa.2210980110. S2CID 97476152.
- Yue, Lan-Ping; Yao, Weiguo; Qi, Zhenzhong; He, Yizhen (1994). "Microstructure of nanometre crystalline films prepared by ion-beam sputtering". Journal of Materials Science Letters. 13 (18): 1311–1313. doi:10.1007/BF00624480. S2CID 137464915.
- Li, Xiao-Guang; Sha, Jian; Zhang, Yuheng; Wu, Guoan; He, Yizhen (1991-03-16). "The Effect of Neutron Irradiation on the Stability of CuTi Amorphous Alloys". Physica Status Solidi A. 124 (1): K1–K5. Bibcode:1991PSSAR.124....1L. doi:10.1002/pssa.2211240137.
- Yizhen, He; Xiao-Guang, Li; Jian, Sha; Yuanda, Dong (August 1988). "Annealing effect on the electrical resistivity of Pd-Si based alloys". Journal of Materials Science Letters. 7 (8): 836–838. doi:10.1007/BF00723778. S2CID 136451125.
- Lan-Ping, Yue; Yi-Zhen, He (1996-05-05). "A study of the Raman scattering of Ge nanocrystallites embedded in SiO_{2} thin films". Acta Physica Sinica. 45 (10): 1756–1761. doi:10.7498/aps.45.1756.
- Xiao-Guang, Li; Yizhen, He (December 1988). "Effect of tensile stress on internal friction near T_{g} of a-Pd_{77.5}Cu_{6}Si_{16.5}". Journal of Materials Science Letters. 7 (12): 1359–1361. doi:10.1007/BF00719983. S2CID 135661167.
- Mao, Ming; He, Yizhen (1988-02-16). "Two-stage structural relaxation of the metallic glass Fe_{46}Ni_{31}V_{1}Si_{8}B_{14}". Physica Status Solidi A. 105 (2): 325–333. Bibcode:1988PSSAR.105..325M. doi:10.1002/pssa.2211050203.
- Dong, Yuanda; Wu, Gucan; Cheng, Lifang; Xiao, Keqin; Li, Xiaoguang; Zhu, Zhaoqin; He, Yizhen (December 1987). "Neutron-irradiation effects on crystallization of Cu-Ti glasses". Chinese Physics Letters. 4 (12): 541–544. Bibcode:1987ChPhL...4..541Y. doi:10.1088/0256-307x/4/12/004. S2CID 250888454.
- Yizhen, He; Jiapeng, Shui; Lanping, Yue (December 1985). "Isothermal annealing effect on the internal friction peak near T_{g} of a-Pd_{80}Si_{20}". Le Journal de Physique Colloques. 46 (C10): C10–473–C10-476. doi:10.1051/jphyscol:198510105.

== Awards and honors ==
- Second Class Prizes of The State Scientific and Technological Progress Award of Chinese Academy of Science in 1988
- Third Class Prizes of The Natural Science Award of Chinese Academy of Science in 1995
- Third Class Prizes of The Natural Science Award of Chinese Academy of Science in 1996
