= Wang Ming-chen =

Chinese female physicist and science educator (1906–2010)

- Born: November 18, 1906; Suzhou, Jiangsu, Qing China
- Died: August 28, 2010 (aged 103); Beijing, China
- Education: Ginling College; Yanjing University; University of Michigan
- Spouse: Yu Qizhong (m. 1948; until his death 1995)
- Scientific career
- Fields: Statistical Mechanics; Theoretical Physics
- Workplaces: Ginling College; Massachusetts Institute of Technology; Yunnan University; University of Notre Dame; Tsinghua University
- Doctoral advisor: George Uhlenbeck
- Other academic advisors: Samuel Goudsmit

Chinese name
- Traditional Chinese: 王明貞
- Simplified Chinese: 王明贞
- Wade–Giles: Wang Ming-chen
- Hanyu Pinyin: Wáng Míngzhēn
Transcriptions
Standard Mandarin
- Hanyu Pinyin: Wáng Míngzhēn
- Wade–Giles: Wang Ming-chen
- Yale Romanization: Wang Ming-Jen

Wang Ming-chen (pinyin: Wáng Míngzhēn, November 18, 1906 – August 28, 2010) was a Chinese theoretical physicist and a professor at Tsinghua University, Beijing. As one of the first few Chinese female students studying science abroad, she was best known for her work on stochastic process and Brownian motion with George Uhlenbeck as well as the first female professor of Tsinghua University according to some sources. (Note: It was reported that Lu Shijia was employed by Tsinghua as a research fellow in the late 1940s, as it was not permitted to hire couple as professors. Her husband was Zhang Wei)

Wang Ming-chen and her cousin He Zehui were sometimes separately credited as "The Chinese Madame Curie".

== Biography ==
Wang was born into a large prominent family in Suzhou, Jiangsu Province on November 18, 1906 (or the 3rd day of the 10th month of year Bingwu / the 32nd year of Guangxu in the Qing dynasty of the Chinese Lunar Calendar) Her siblings include several renowned Chinese scientists, physicians, and engineers, who pursued western education in the early 1900s. Wang was also among the first Chinese female students who received undergraduate education in Christian schools Ginling College, Nanjing (first and second year) and Yenching University, Beijing (third and last year). She also received her master's degree from Yenching University in 1932.

According to her autobiography, after receiving her bachelor's degree she convinced her father to break her engagement that had been arranged before she began her university studies so that she could study abroad. She was offered a Barbour scholarship to study at the University of Michigan but could not afford the cost of travel at the time, so she continued to teach at Yenching University to save money, where she also eventually received her master's degree. After this, she was invited by the principal of Ginling College to teach math and physics, where she remained from 1932 to 1937 until she had to flee Nanjing for Wuhan on the eve of the Japanese invasion of the city (see Nanking Massacre) and from there she moved to the Shanghai branch of Ginling College circa January 1938. She applied once again to University of Michigan under a Barbour scholarship, as well as applying to study in England under the Sino-British Boxer Indemnity Scholarship. Despite testing as the top applicant to the latter, she was passed up due to being a woman. She was accepted to the University of Michigan to study theoretical physics in 1938.

She received her PhD in 1942 from the University of Michigan and published several papers in the area of statistical mechanics with George Uhlenbeck and Samuel Goudsmit. From 1943 to 1945 she worked on noise research at the MIT Radiation Laboratory for the US Military in World War II. It was then she published the paper "On the Theory of the Brownian Motion II" with Uhlenbeck. James L. Lawson and Uhlenbeck also acknowledged Wang in the preface of Threshold Signals, a book from the MIT Radiation Laboratory Series, which published the research of the lab.

After the war, she returned to China in 1946 and became a professor in the mathematics and physics department at Yunnan University from 1947 to 1949. She married scholar Yu Qizhong (Chinese: 俞启忠) in 1948. In 1949, due to the Chinese Civil War, Wang decided to return to the US and worked at the University of Notre Dame with Eugene Guth until the Korean War broke out. She resigned from Notre Dame and eventually returned to China in 1955. She was not allowed to return to China despite filing an application circa 1953, as the US was in the McCarthyism period and she had worked in sensitive research areas. Nevertheless her husband was allowed to leave or stay with her from 1953 to 1955.

In 1955, Wang became a professor of physics at Tsinghua University, Beijing and taught statistical physics and thermodynamics until the Cultural Revolution started in 1966. In 1966, Wang was suddenly arrested and imprisoned until 1973.

Her husband Yu was also arrested until finally being released in 1975. After the Cultural Revolution ended, the Organization Department of the Chinese Communist Party announced that Wang and Yu's arrest was completely unjust and was due to political persecution by Jiang Qing, then Mao's wife and a member of the Gang of Four.

Wang retired from Tsinghua in 1976 and lived in Beijing until she died in 2010.

== Personal life ==
Her younger brothers Wang Shouwu, Wang Shoujue, brother-in-law Lu Xueshan (husband of Wang Shoucan) were members of Chinese Academy of Sciences; her older sister Wang Shuzhen was a professor in obstetrics and gynaecology and president of the Red House Hospital in Shanghai.

Wang Ming-chen's paternal grandmother, Xie Zhangda (1849-1934), founded a girls middle school in Suzhou, a predecessor of Suzhou No.10 Middle School, of which Wang was an alumna as well as some of her family members. Wang's father, K.T. Wang (Chinese: 王季同), published the Wang-algebra; according to some historians, K.T. Wang's paper in the Proceedings of the Royal Irish Academy in 1911 was one of the earliest papers by a Chinese scientist to appear in a foreign journal.

== See also ==
- Qian Xuesen, fellow Chinese scientist who also studied in the US (MIT, Caltech) and also returned to Mainland China in 1950s
