= Ke T'ing-sui =

Chinese physicist and writer

Kê T'íng-suì
- 葛庭燧
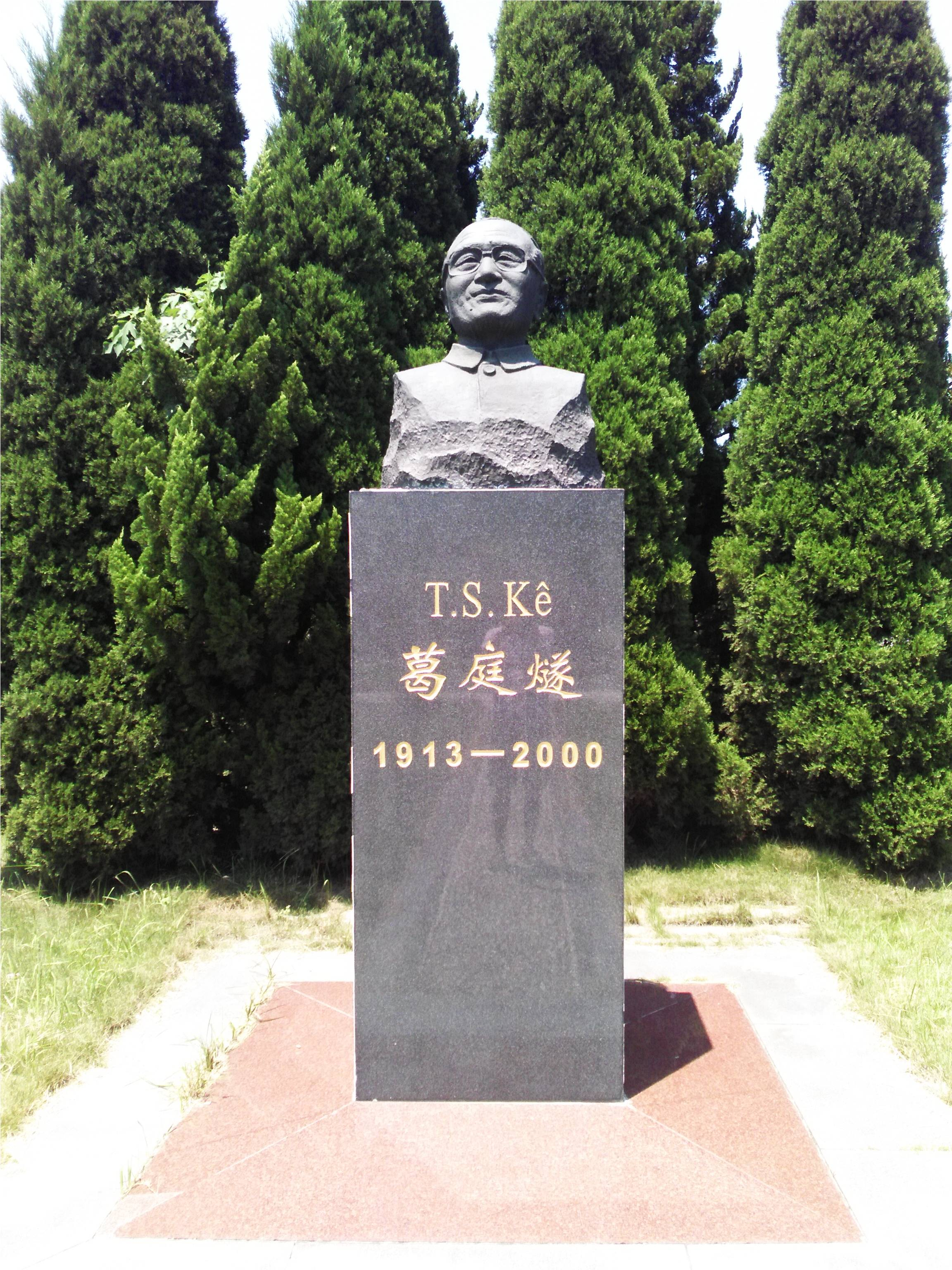
- Statue of Kê T'íng-suì
- Born: May 3, 1913; Penglai, Shandong
- Died: April 29, 2000 (aged 86)
- Education: Tsinghua University (B.S.), Yenching University (M.S.), University of California at Berkeley (Ph.D)
- Spouse: He Yizhen
- Awards: Zener Prize (1989), Robert F. Mehl Award (1999)
- Scientific career
- Fields: Physics
- Institutions: University of Chicago, Max-Planck Institut für Metallforschung, INSA Lyon, Chinese Academy of Sciences

Kê T'ing-sui or Ge Tingsui (Chinese: 葛庭燧; pinyin: Gê Tíngsùi; Wade–Giles: Kê T'íng-suì; May 3, 1913 – April 29, 2000), also known as T.S. Kê, was a Chinese physicist and writer renowned for his contributions in internal friction, anelasticity, solid state physics and metallurgy. He was the member of the Chinese Academy of Sciences, known for the Kê-type pendulum and Kê grain-boundary internal friction peak named after him. In March 1982, he founded the Institute of Solid State Physics in Hefei, Anhui, China.

== Biography ==
Kê was born in Penglai, Shandong province. He was admitted to Tsinghua University in 1930 but suffered pulmonary disease which required him to rest for two years where he earned a B.S. in physics in 1937. He obtained an M.S. in physics at Yenching University in 1940. In July 1941, Kê married He Yizhen in Shanghai and the following month they traveled together to California. Kê received his Ph.D. in physics after only pursuing it for two years at the University of California at Berkeley in 1943. In the years 1943–1945 and 1945–1949, respectively, he worked as a staff member at the Massachusetts Institute of Technology and research associate at the University of Chicago.

In 1949, Kê returned to China and became a professor in physics at Tsinghua University and a research associate at the Applied Physics Laboratory of the Chinese Academy of Sciences (CAS). In October 1952, he relocated to Shenyang to participate in the establishment of the Institute of Metal Research of CAS as a research associate where he became deputy director from 1961 to 1981. In 1955, Kê was elected academician of CAS and became a member of the Mathematics and Physics Committee of CAS. In 1980, he was transferred to Hefei for the establishment of the Hefei branch of CAS where he served as its deputy director and later jointly became the first head of the Institute of Solid State Physics incepted in March 1982.

In 1979 he was a visiting professor at the Max-Planck Institut für Metallforschung in Germany, and in 1980, a guest professor at the INSA de Lyon in France.

== Research ==
In 1945, Kê started research on internal friction and anelastic properties in metals at the University of Chicago where he accomplished advanced studies of grain-boundary relaxation and non-linear anelastic relaxation associated to interactions between point defects and dislocations. This work continued after he returned to China in 1949 where he made further progress. The Kê-type torsion pendulum bears his name, as well as the Kê grain-boundary internal friction peak. Kê also proposed the Kê grain-boundary model for disordered atomic groups. Kê also participated in the Manhattan Project and the Long-Range Radar projects.

== Personal life ==
In 1941, Kê married He Yizhen, a physicist who would specialize in amorphous physics was metallic glass, and was a founder of the Institute of Metal Research and Institute of Solid State Physics. They developed a competitive relationship with one another due to their studies in the same field.

The couple met at Yenching University, where he had been a lecturer and was three years older than Kê. Because He came from a wealthy and influential family, she had a number of admirers; her family did not approve of her relationship with Kê became he came from a poor family and also suffered from pulmonary tuberculosis, for which a valid treatment was not available at the time. Furthermore, Kê's political beliefs clashed with He's father, who disagreed with Ge's support of the political activism of students. In opposition to her family's wishes, she married Kê; their marriage became a much-told tale in Chinese academia and their love letters are still preserved in their biographies.

After their marriage, Kê obtained the opportunity to study in the United States with He, where they remained from 1941 to 1949. Their two children were born in the United States and eventually became scientists: their daughter Ge Yunpei (1942-2013) was a professor in Shenyang Jianzhu University, while their son Ge Yunjian (born 1947), is an expert in robotics. The couple returned to China in 1949, where they both worked for the Chinese Academy of Science for decades. When Kê was dispatched to work in Hefei in 1980, Kê and their children persuaded He to stop her research to join him in Hefei.

== Awards ==
Professor T.S. Kê was a recipient of numerous national and international awards such as the Zener Prize in 1989, and Robert Franklin Mehl Award in 1999 (considered to be the highest international award in the field of materials science).
