= He Zehui =

Chinese physicist (1914–2011)

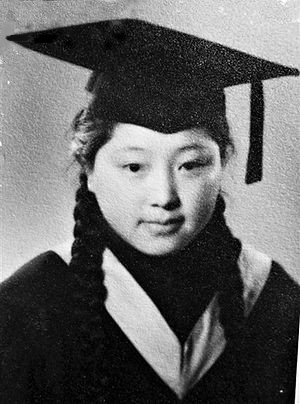
- Graduated in 1936
- Born: March 5, 1914; Suzhou, China
- Died: June 20, 2011 (aged 97); Beijing, China
- Education: Tsinghua University; Technische Universität Berlin
- Known for: Discovery of ternary and quaternary fission (1946)
- Spouse: Qian Sanqiang
- Children: 3
- Scientific career
- Fields: Nuclear physics
- Workplaces: Siemens AG (1940–1943); Kaiser Wilhelm Institute (1943–1945); Curie Institute (1946–1948); Institute of Physics, Chinese Academy of Sciences (1950–1973); Institute of High-Energy Physics, Chinese Academy of Sciences (1973–1984)
- Thesis: A new precise and simple method of measuring the speed of flying bullets (1940)

He Zehui
- Simplified Chinese: 何泽慧
- Traditional Chinese: 何澤慧
- Hanyu Pinyin: Hé Zéhuì
Transcriptions
Standard Mandarin
- Hanyu Pinyin: Hé Zéhuì

He Zehui or Ho Zah-wei (Chinese: 何泽慧; March 5, 1914 – June 20, 2011) was a Chinese nuclear physicist who worked with Walther Bothe in Nazi Germany during World War II and with Irène Joliot-Curie in Paris, and later helped develop the Chinese nuclear programme. She is credited with discovering the phenomenon of elastic collision between positrons and electrons by 1945, and – jointly with her husband Qian Sanqiang – ternary and quaternary fission in the uranium nucleus in 1946.

== Biography ==
=== Family ===
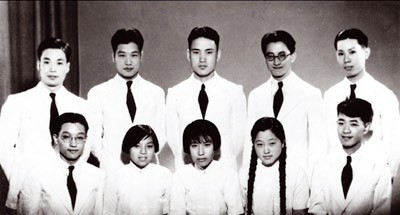
The 1936 graduation class of the physics department at Tsinghua University. He Zehui is at the front, second from right; her future husband Qian Sanqiang is at the back, far left.

He Zehui was born in Suzhou in 1914 as the daughter of He Cheng, an early member of the Tongmenghui, who had received his education in Japan. She attended 振華女中 (Zhenhua Girls' School), a predecessor of Suzhou No.10 Middle School, founded by her maternal grandmother, Wangxie Changda and headed by her aunt, Wang Jiyu. She represented the school on the volleyball team. Her family is famous for producing three renowned women scientists. In addition to He Zehui, her older sister He Yizhen was an authority in spectroscopy and material science, and her younger sister He Zeying (何泽瑛) was a distinguished botanist. She was the cousin of Wang Ming-Chen. They are both sometimes credited as "The Chinese Madame Curie".

=== Education ===
He Zehui graduated with a degree in physics from the Tsinghua University in Beijing at the top of her class (which included her future husband Qian Sanqiang) in 1936. At Tsinghua, she enjoyed the protection of Zhou Peiyuan, a close acquaintance of her cousin Wang Shoujing, who is said to have treated her as his sister. With help from her father, who secured a generous scholarship from the Shanxi governor, the warlord Yan Xishan, she went on to study experimental ballistics at the Technische Hochschule zu Berlin. She was sent to Germany because the Germans were interested in high technology ordnance. She earned a PhD in engineering at the Technische Hochschule in 1940 with a dissertation on A new precise and simple method of measuring the speed of flying bullets. While completing her degree, she stayed in Berlin with Friedrich Paschen, the retired teacher of her supervisor, and was welcomed into his family.

=== Work in Nazi Germany (1940–1945) ===
Stranded in Germany after its Nazi government launched World War II, she found employment at Siemens, (Note: Siemens was the preferred supplier of machinery to Yan Xishan, the sponsor of Zehui's initial study in Germany, between 1936–1939, despite abusing his lack of technological know-how to sell him old equipment. The NSDAP representative in North China, Werner Jannings, is credited with keeping Yan in the Nazi orbit.) where she carried out research into the electroweak interaction. In 1943, as the Allied bombing of Berlin recommenced, she was introduced by Paschen to Walther Bothe, the director of the Physics Institute at the Kaiser Wilhelm Institute for Medical Research (currently the Max Planck Institute for Medical Research) in Heidelberg and one of the leaders of the German Uranium Project. She left Berlin and joined Bothe's nuclear physics team in Heidelberg. Bothe completed his work on the first German cyclotron in December 1943. Zehui then assisted Heinz Maier-Leibnitz in building his second cloud chamber and using it to study positron–electron collisions, testing the theories of Homi J. Bhabha and Paul Dirac. This led her to discover the elastic electron–positron collision phenomenon. She communicated her findings through letters to Qian Sanqiang in Paris.

=== Work in Paris (1946–1948) ===
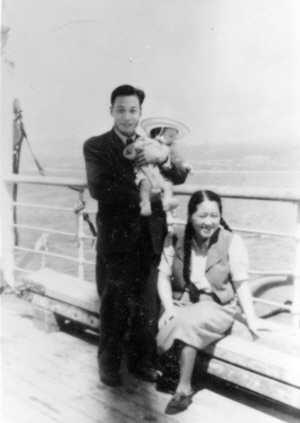
Qian Sanqiang, their daughter, and He Zehui on their return to China in 1948

In September 1945, after British–French scientific relations had resumed, Sanqiang presented Zehui's results, which included the very first picture of a positron–electron scatter, at the British–French Conference on Cosmic Rays in Bristol. A report of the findings was highlighted in the volume 156 of Nature in November of that year. Zehui married Sanqiang in Paris in the spring of 1946, and joined him under the supervision of Irène Joliot-Curie and Frédéric Joliot-Curie in the Nuclear Chemistry Laboratory of the Collège de France and the Curie Laboratory of the Institut du Radium. She continued her previous research on positron–electron collisions. Together with her husband, she proved and explained the mechanism of ternary fission, and made the first observation of quaternary fission in the uranium nucleus in November 1946. She departed for China with her husband and baby daughter in May 1948.

=== Career in China (from 1948) ===
On her return to China, she accepted a position at the Institute of Physics of the National Academy of Peiping (IOPNAP), where she set up the Atomic Research Institute as its sole full-time fellow, before the IOPNAP was merged into the Institute of Physics, Chinese Academy of Sciences (IOPCAS) in 1950. She and her husband decided to stay after the Chinese Communist Party took power in China. Despite their foreign connections, her husband was authorised to spend large sums abroad on scientific equipment. In 1955 her husband was asked to develop an atomic bomb by the Chinese Government. The following year He Zehui won the third place Science Award given by the Chinese Academy of Sciences for work in creating nuclear emulsions.

Following the conclusion of the Chinese Communist Revolution, Zehui was a research fellow at the Modern Physics Institute of the Chinese Academy of Sciences (CAS) from 1950 and led the Neutron Physics Research Division. The MPI was renamed as Atomic Energy Institute in 1958, and Zehui served as its deputy director from 1963 to 1973. In 1973, she moved to the newly established Institute of High-Energy Physics (IHEP) at the CAS and remained its deputy director until 1984.

She worked on many problems associated with nuclear weapons and their testing. The Chinese state built their first nuclear reactor and cyclotron with Soviet assistance in the 1950s, and they developed a nuclear bomb and a hydrogen bomb that were both successfully tested in the 1960s.

She maintained a low profile during the Cultural Revolution (1966–1976). She subsequently turned her attention to cosmic rays and high-energy astrophysics. In 1978, she visited Germany and the CERN, then the US and other countries, working to foster international collaboration.

== Awards and honors ==
Throughout her life, she continued to work on high energy physics. She was elected to the Chinese Academy of Sciences in 1980. She became an iconic figure in China. The science laboratories at her old school are named in her honour.

== Personal life ==
Her husband died in 1992. They had three children, two girls and a boy. Their eldest daughter Qian Zuxuan was a physicist affiliated with the Centre de physique des particules de Marseille. Their second daughter Qian Minxie is a professor of chemistry at Peking University. Their son Qian Sijin also works for Peking University as a physicist. He Zehui died in Beijing in 2011, at the age of 97.

== Bibliography ==
- Wang, Huibin (2020), "Born to do science? A case study of family factors in the academic lives of the Chinese scientific elite", Cultures of Science, 3 (3): 186–196, doi:10.1177/2096608320960243
