= Forensic colorimetry =

Color analysis technique

Forensic colorimetry, or forensic color analysis, is the examination of specimen color for purposes of forensic investigation. Typical specimens involved in color analyses include pigments, dyes, or other objects that are distinguishable by their intrinsic color. Analyses may be conducted by-eye or by computational methods, both by matching specimen colors to a standardised chart or database.

== Methodology ==
There are numerous quantitative and qualitative methods that an investigator may employ to analyse specimen color.

=== Visual analysis ===
Color analysis can be conducted by-eye, usually matching specimen color with reference charts. This methodology has been used extensively in soil analysis, often using the Munsell color system as the reference. While this is a traditionally used method, it is considerably subjective, relying on the ability of the naked eye to match colors.

=== Spectrophotometry ===
Spectrophotometers are devices that measure the light absorbed or transmitted by colored objects. More recent developments have led to advances in handheld spectrophotometers, which allow comparisons between sample color and database colors without the need for multiple pieces of equipment. These devices are most practical for analysing colors on a flat, homogeneous solid surface.

=== Digital photography with post-processing ===
Where a heterogeneous specimen, such as a soil or powder, requires quantitative analysis, digital photography may be used. This method has successfully been demonstrated in forensic soil analysis, using the Munsell colour system. A similar method has been applied to nuclear forensics, for the quantification of uranium oxide powder color. Both methods report suitability for use by both experts and non-experts alike, as the methods only require a camera on site. A drawback of this method is in the lack of centralised databases for color matching.
