= Yona Keisari =

Israeli immunologist

- יונה קיסרי
- Born: January 10, 1947 (age 79); Munich, Germany
- Education: Tel Aviv University (M.Sc., 1971); Tel Aviv University (Ph.D., 1976)
- Occupations: immunologist, cancer researcher
- Employer: Tel Aviv University
- Notable work: Cancer Immunology, novel applications of radiotherapy

Yona Keisari (Hebrew: יונה קיסרי; born January 10, 1947) is an Israeli immunologist, cancer researcher, and professor emeritus at the Department of Microbiology and Clinical Immunology in the Faculty of Medical and Health Sciences, Tel Aviv University. He is an expert in the field of immunology of cancerous tumors, and co-founder of the radiotherapy company "Alpha Tau Medical".

== Biography ==
Yona Keisari was born in a displaced persons camp in southern Germany, the son of Froim (Ephraim) and Miriam (née Bortman) Keyzerman, Holocaust survivors born in Bessarabia. He immigrated to Israel with his family in 1949.

After his elementary school studies he was invited to Jerusalem for the first class of the boarding school for outstanding students from around Israel, which later merged into the Mae Boyer High School. He did his military service in the Air Force.

Upon his release from the IDF in 1966, he began his studies for a master's degree in microbiology in a direct track at Tel Aviv University and completed them in 1971. Immediately after that he continued to study for a Ph.D. in this field, under the guidance of Prof. Isaac Witz. His doctoral thesis was submitted in 1976 and dealt with the study of the cancer microenvironment (tumor microenvironment).

From 1976 to 1978 he was a postdoctoral fellow at the National Cancer Institute of the United States at the NIH in Bethesda. Upon his return to Israel in 1979, he joined the faculty of the Faculty of Medicine as a lecturer. In 1983 he was appointed senior lecturer and in 1993 an associate professor. In 2002 he was appointed a full professor. Over the years he served as a visiting scientist at The University of Texas MD Anderson Cancer Center.

Keisari served as head of the Department of Human Microbiology from 1995 to 1997 and as head of the Department of Clinical Immunology and Microbiology from 2005 to 2007. In 2015 he retired, but continues active research at the university and mentoring research students.

Married since 1968 to Nava, they are parents of three and grandparents of ten. Keisari lives in Ramat Gan.

== Research ==
Keisari is a co-author of over 100 scientific articles and book chapters. As a faculty member at the university, he engaged in research in immunology and educated medical and graduate students in the field.

His research is devoted to two main topics: the development of treatments that destroy cancerous tumors and the activation of the immune response, and innate immunity to lung infections.

=== Development of treatments activating a tumor immune response ===
Keisari is one of the researchers who studied the potential of destroying cancerous lesions in the body in order to activate the immune response against the tumor, known as the abscopal effect.

He showed that the destruction of solid metastatic experimental tumors (tumor ablation) by physical means such as radioactive radiation, photodynamic therapy, or electrical therapy, can stimulate a specific anti-tumor immune response. Since 1991, he has been working on developing treatment protocols for metastatic tumors using combinations of radiation, chemotherapy, and immunotherapy.

=== Intra-tumoral alpha radiation ===
Since 2003, Keisari has been involved in the development of a treatment for the destruction of malignant tumors by intra-tumoral alpha radiation. Keisari, together with his physicist colleague Prof. Itzhak Kelson and their students Dr. Lior Arazi and Dr. Tomer Cooks, developed a treatment modality for cancer using radioactive needles in combination with boosting the activity of the immune system. The treatment, known as Diffusing alpha emitter Radiation Therapy (DaRT) is based on needles loaded with radium-224. These needles are inserted into the tumors and release short-lived atoms that emit alpha particles, which disperse in the tumor and deliver targeted alpha radiation. The treatment can be given in combination with immune system boosters or chemotherapy.

Keisari's research showed that destruction of solid tumors with DaRT triggered anti-tumor immune reactivity which could be enhanced by immune manipulation. The treatment was granted Breakthrough Device Designation by the FDA. Kelson and Keisari together with Uzi Sofer and Amnon Gat participated in the establishment of "Alpha Tau Medical" which commercializes the treatment. Keisari serves as the chief scientific officer of this company.

In Israel and around the world, patients with skin or head and neck squamous-cell carcinoma tumors have been treated as part of clinical trials in Israel, the United States, Canada, Japan, and European countries.

=== Lung infections ===
His research on the innate immunity against lung infections was conducted in collaboration with the bacteriologist Prof. Itzhak Ofek and focused on the involvement of macrophages, surfactant proteins and defensins in the protection of the lungs against Klebsiella pneumoniae infections. These studies emphasized the role of macrophages in the protection of the lungs against this pathogen.

=== Additional research topics ===
Increasing the sensitivity of cancer tumor cells to alpha radiation.

== Public activity ==
In 2009, Keisari was a member of the executive committee that founded the Israeli Society for Cancer Research and served as its secretary (2011–2013) and then as its president (2013–2015). He is a member of several national and international professional societies. He works to promote cancer research in Israel and served on national and international committees. Keisari was involved in the promotion of science-oriented youth and volunteer lectures as part of the "Bashaar" association.

== Positions and awards ==
- President, Israeli Society for Cancer Research (2013–2015)
- Honorary citizen in the city of Ramat Gan (2021)

== Selected publications ==
- Keisari, Y., Witz, I.P.. The specific blocking of humoral immune cytolysis mediated by antitumor antibodies degraded by lysosomal enzymes of tumor origin. Eur. J. Immunol. 5: 790-795, 1975.
- Pick, E., Y. Keisari. A simple colorimetric method for the measurement of hydrogen peroxide produced by cells in culture. J. Immunol. Methods 38: 161-170, 1980.
- Flescher, E., P. Gonen, Y. Keisari. Oxidative burst dependent tumoricidal and tumorostatic activities of paraffin oil elicited mouse macrophages. J. Natl. Cancer Inst. 72: 1341-1347, 1984.
- Malkin, R., E. Flescher, J. Lengy, Y. Keisari. On the interactions between macrophages and developmental stages of Schistosoma ansoni: the cytotoxic mechanism involved in macrophage mediated killing of schistosomula in vitro. Immunobiology 176: 63-72, 1987.
- Dimri, R., L. Nissimov, Y. Keisari. Effect of human recombinant granulocyte-macrophage colony stimulating factor and IL-3 on the expression of surface markers of human monocyte derived macrophages in long term cultures. Lymphokine and Cytokine Res. 13: 239-245, 1994.
- Ophir, R., G. Moalem, M. Pecht, M. Shashoua, G. Rashid, S. Ben-Efraim, N. Trainin, Y. Burstein, Y. Keisari. Thymic humoral factor (THF-gamma2) mediated reduction of pulmonary metastases and augmentation of immunocompetence in C57Bl mice bearing B16 melanoma. J. Immunother. 22: 103-113, 1999.
- Blank, M., M. Mandel, G. Lavie, Y. Keisari. Tumoricidal effects of photodynamic therapy with hypericin in mice bearing highly invasive solid tumors. Oncol. Res. 12: 409-418; 2001.
- Gannot, G., I. Gannot, H. Vered, A. Buchner, Y. Keisari. Increase in immune cell infiltration with progression of epithelial transformation from hyperkeratosis to dysplasia and towards carcinoma in the oral cavity. Brit. J. Cancer 86: 1444-1448; 2002.
- Entin, I., A. Plotnikov, R. Korenstein, Y. Keisari. Tumor growth retardation, cure, and induction of anti-tumor immunity in B16 melanoma bearing mice by low electric field enhanced chemotherapy. Clin. Cancer Res. 9: 3190-3197, 2003.
- Kostina E., Ofek I., Crouch E., Friedman R., Sirota L., Klinger G., Sahly H., Keisari Y. Noncapsulated K. pneumoniae bearing mannose-containing O-antigens are more rapidly eradicated from mouse lung, and trigger cytokine production by macrophages following opsonization with surfactant protein D. Infect. Immun. 73:8282-8280; 2005.
- Cooks, T., Arazi, L., Efrati, M., Schmidt, M., Marshak, G., Kelson, I., Keisari, Y. Interstitial wires releasing diffusing alpha-emitters combined with chemotherapy improved local tumor control and survival in squamous cell carcinoma bearing mice. Cancer 115: 1791-1801; 2009.
- Keisari, Y., Hochman, I., Confino, H., Korenstein, R., Kelson, I. Activation of local and systemic anti-tumor immune responses by ablation of solid tumors with intra-tumoral electrochemical or alpha radiation treatments. Cancer Immunol. Immunother. 63:1-9; 2014.
- Confino, H., Hochman, I., Efrati, M., Schmidt, M., Umansky, V., Kelson, I., Keisari, Y. Tumor ablation by intratumoral Ra-224 loaded wires induce anti-tumor immunity against experimental metastatic tumors. Cancer Immunol. Immunother. 64:191-199; 2015.
- Keisari Y. Tumor abolition and antitumor immunostimulation by physico-chemical tumor ablation. Frontiers Biosc. (Landmark edition), 22: 310-347, 2017.
- Popovtzer, A., Rosenfeld, E., Mizrachi, A., Bellia, SR., Ben-Hur, R., Feliciani, G., Sarnelli, MA., Arazi, L., Deutch, L., Kelson, I., Keisari, Y. Initial Safety and Tumor Control Results from a “First-in-Human” Multicenter Prospective Trial Evaluating a Novel Alpha-Emitting radionuclide for the Treatment of Locally Advanced Recurrent Squamous Cell Carcinomas of the Skin and Head and Neck. Int. J. Rad. Oncol. Biol. & Phys. 2020, 106, 571-578.
- Keisari, Y., Kelson, I. The potentiation of anti-tumor immunity by tumor abolition with alpha particles, protons or carbon ion radiation and its enforcement by combination with immunoadjuvants or inhibitors of immune suppressor cells and check point molecules. Cells, 10, 228, 2021.
- Keisari, Y., Kelson, I. Tumor ablation induced anti-tumor immunity: destruction of the tumor in situ with the aim to evoke a robust anti-tumor immune response. Cancer and metastasis Reviews. Published online 11.11.2023.
