= Institute of Solid State Physics =

The Institute of Solid State Physics may refer to:

- Institute of Solid State Physics (Bulgaria)
- Institute of Solid State Physics, Chinese Academy of Sciences
- Institute of Solid State Physics (Russia)
- Institute for Solid State Physics (Japan)
