= Nuclear forensics =

Investigation of unlawful nuclear materials and their proliferation

Nuclear forensics is the investigation of nuclear materials to find evidence for the source, trafficking, and enrichment of the material. The material can be recovered from various sources including dust from the vicinity of a nuclear facility, or from the radioactive debris following a nuclear explosion.

Results of nuclear forensic testing are used by different organisations to make decisions. The information is typically combined with other sources of information such as law enforcement and intelligence information.

== History ==
=== Origins ===
The first investigative radiochemical measurements began in the early days of nuclear fission. In 1944, the US Air Force made the first attempts to detect fissiogenic ^{133}Xe in the atmosphere in order to indicate the production of plutonium through the irradiation of uranium and chemical reprocessing in an effort to gather intelligence on the status of the German nuclear program. However, no ^{133}Xe was detected.

=== Post-RDS-1 ===
In the subsequent years it became increasingly valuable to gather information on the Soviet nuclear weapons program, which resulted in the development of technologies that could gather airborne particles in a WB-29 weather reconnaissance plane. On September 3, 1949, these particles were used to determine that the detonation time of the first Soviet atomic test, "Joe 1". Further analysis revealed that this bomb was a replicate of the "Fat Man", which was the bomb dropped on Nagasaki in 1945. This investigative methodology combined radiochemistry and other techniques to gather intelligence on nuclear activities.

During the 1961 Soviet nuclear tests, most of the Novaya Zemlya shots were likely monitored by RB-47 aircraft flown from RAF Brize Norton and elsewhere. In August, Khrushchev had announced the existence 100 megaton Soviet bomb, ultimately tested as the Tsar Bomba. A JKC-135A was rapidly outfitted to monitor the test, under Operation Speed Light Bravo. Photomutiplier detectors in UV, visibile, and near-IR were used, with multiplication factors above 100 million. Cine and stills cameras were used, with lens resolutions up to 70 mm. One side of the aircraft was scorched. It has been argued that if the Tsar Bomba had been configured to yield 100 megatons instead of the decided 50, that the aircraft would have been destroyed.

The United Kingdom worked with the US to monitor Soviet tests. RAF debris collection missions flew from the summer of 1949 from Scotland, Northern Ireland, and Gibraltar, filling the North Atlantic. British scientists also used unconventional methods for sourcing possible bomb debris: workers holidaying in Europe were instructed to collect pinecones, and crates of tea leaves were imported from China.

=== Post-Cold War ===
The first seizures of nuclear or otherwise radioactive material were reported in Switzerland and Italy in 1991. Later, reports of incidents of nuclear material occurred in Germany, the Czech Republic, Hungary and other central European countries. Nuclear forensics became a new branch of scientific research with the intent of not only determining the nature of the material, but also the intended use of the seized material as well as its origin and about the potential trafficking routes. Nuclear forensics relies on making these determinations through measurable parameters including, but not limited to chemical impurities, isotopic composition, microscopic appearance, and microstructure. By measuring these parameters, conclusions can be drawn as to the origin of the material. Identification of these parameters is an ongoing area of research, however, data interpretation also relies on the availability of reference information and on knowledge of the fuel cell operations.

The first seizures of nuclear materials from trafficking in the early 1990s allowed the nuclear forensic methodology to be adopted by a wider scientific community. When scientific laboratories outside the weapons and intelligence community took an interest in this methodology was when the term "Nuclear Forensics" was coined. Unlike standard forensics, nuclear forensics focuses mainly on the nuclear or radioactive material and aims to provide knowledge of the intended use of the materials.

In 1994 560 grams of plutonium and uranium oxide were intercepted at Munich airport in an airplane coming from Moscow. The precise composition was 363 grams plutonium (87% of which was Plutonium-239) and 122 grams of uranium. It later emerged through a German parliamentary enquiry that the purchase had been arranged and financed by the German Federal Intelligence Service.

U.S. Department of Energy official Jay A. Tilden has advocated for the use of nuclear forensics science to assign responsibility for, or resolve ambiguity about, "unattributed nuclear events," such as accidents at nuclear facilities, nuclear weapons mishaps in denied geographic areas, accidental nuclear detonations, the limited use of nuclear weapons and subsequent denial of responsibility by the perpetrator, and attempts to blame a clandestine nuclear attack on non-state actors. An example of an unattributed nuclear event was the September 2017 unattributed release of the radioisotope ruthenium across central and eastern Europe and Asia.

== Chronometry ==
Determining a nuclear material's age is critical to nuclear forensic investigations. Dating techniques can be utilized to identify a material's source as well as procedures performed on the material. This can aid in determining the information about the potential participant in the "age" of the material of interest. Nuclides, related through radioactive decay processes will have relative sample concentrations that can be predicted using parent-daughter in-growth equations and relevant half-lives. Because radioactive isotopes decay at a rate determined by the amount of the isotope in a sample and the half-life of the parent isotope, the relative amount of the decay products compared to the parent isotopes can be used to determine "age". Heavy element nuclides have a 4n+2 relationship, where the mass number divided by 4 leaves a remainder of two. The decay network begins with ^{238}Pu and proceeds through the in-growth of long-lived ^{234}U, ^{230}Th, and ^{226}Ra. If any member of the 4n+2 decay chain is purified it will immediately begin to produce descendant species. The time since a sample was last purified can be calculated from the ratio of any two concentrations among the decaying nuclides.

Essentially, if a nuclear material has been put through a refinement process to remove the daughter species, the time elapsed since purification can be "back-calculated" using radiochemical separation techniques in conjunction with analytical measurement of the existing parent-daughter ratios. For example, the α decay of ^{239}Pu to ^{235}U can be used as an example of this procedure. with the assumption of a perfect purification time T_{0} then there will be a linear relationship between the in-growth of ^{235}U and time elapsed since purification. There are, however, various instances where the correlation is not as clear. This strategy may not apply when the parent-daughter pair achieve secular equilibrium very rapidly or when the half-life of the daughter nuclide is significantly shorter than the time that has elapsed since purification of the nuclear material, e.g. ^{237}Np/^{233}Pa. Another possible complication is if in environmental samples, non-equivalent metal/ion transport for parents and daughter species may complicate or invalidate the use of chronometric measurements. Special age-dating relationships exist, including the commonly employed ^{234}U/^{230}Th and ^{241}Pu/^{241}Am chronometers. In special circumstances, parent-granddaughter relationships can be used to elucidate the age of nuclear materials when the material is intentionally made to look older through the addition of daughter nuclides.

Chronometry is based on the concept that the composition of the nuclear material changes as samples are prepared and analyzed. This barrier can be substantial for species that decay quickly or whose daughter products put forth spectral interferences. The decay of ^{233}U, for example, has a t_{1/2}~1.6×10^{5}years which is rapid in comparison to many species and yield ^{229}Th, which emits an α particle that is isoenergetic, having the same energy, as the parent. To avoid this, freshly prepared samples as well as complementary analysis methods are used for confident nuclear materials characterization. The decay of nuclear samples makes rapid analysis methods highly desirable.

== Separations ==
Chemical separation techniques are frequently utilized in nuclear forensics as a method of reducing the interferences and to facilitate the measurement of low level radionuclides. Purification that occurs rapidly as progeny in-growth begins immediately following purification is ideal.

=== Anion Exchange ===
Anion exchange separation methods are widely used in the purification of actinides and actinide bearing materials through the use of resin columns. The anionic actinide complexes are retained by anion exchange sites that are on the resin and neutral species pass through the column unretained. Then the retained species can be eluted from the column by conversion to a neutral complex, typically by changing the mobile phase passed through the resin bed. Anion exchange-based separations of actinides, while valued for their simplicity and widely used, tend to be time-consuming and are infrequently automated. Most are still dependent on gravity. Speeding up the flow of the mobile phase tends to introduce problems such as impurities and jeopardize future investigations. Hence, there is still a need for development of this technique to satisfy the nuclear forensic research priorities.

=== Co-Precipitation ===
Actinide isolation by co-precipitation is frequently used for samples of relatively large volumes to concentrate analytes and remove interferences. Actinide carriers include iron hydroxides, lanthanide fluorides/hydroxides, manganese dioxide, and a few other species.

== Analysis ==
A wide range of instrumental techniques are employed in nuclear forensics. Radiometric counting techniques are useful when determining decay products of species with short half-lives. However, for longer half-lives, inorganic mass spec is a powerful means of carrying out elemental analysis and determining isotopic relationships. Microscopy approaches can also be useful in characterization of a nuclear material.

=== Counting Techniques ===
Counting techniques of α,β,γ or neutron can be used as approaches for the analysis of nuclear forensic materials that emit decay species. The most common of these are alpha and gamma spectroscopy. β counting is used infrequently because most short lived β-emitters also give off characteristic γ-rays and produce very broad counting peaks. Neutron counting are found more rarely in analytical labs due in part to shielding concerns should such neutron emitters be introduced into a counting facility.

==== Alpha-particle spectroscopy ====
Alpha-particle spectroscopy is a method of measuring the radionuclides based on emission of α particles. They can be measured by a variety of detectors, including liquid scintillation counters, gas ionization detectors, and ion-implanted silicon semiconductor detectors. Typical alpha-particle spectrometers have low backgrounds and measure particles ranging from 3 to 10 MeV. Radionuclides that decay through α emission tend to eject α particles with discrete, characteristic energies between 4 and 6 MeV. These energies become attenuated as they pass through the layers of sample. Increasing the distance between the source and the detector can lead to improved resolution, but decreased particle detection.

The advantages of alpha-particle spectroscopy include relatively inexpensive equipment costs, low backgrounds, high selectivity, and good throughput capabilities with the use of multi-chamber systems. There are also disadvantages of alpha-particle spectroscopy. One disadvantage is that there must be significant sample preparation to obtain useful spectroscopy sources. Also, spectral interferences or artifacts from extensive preparation prior to counting, to minimize this high purity acids are needed. Another disadvantage is that measurements require a large quantity of material which can also lead to poor resolution. Also, undesired spectral overlap and long analysis times are disadvantages.

==== Gamma Spectroscopy ====
Gamma spectroscopy yields results that are conceptually equivalent to alpha-particle spectroscopy, however, can result in sharper peaks due to reduced attenuation of energy. Some radionuclides produce discrete γ-rays that produce energy between a few KeV to 10 MeV which can be measured with a gamma-ray spectrometer. This can be accomplished without destroying the sample. The most common gamma-ray detector is a semiconductor germanium detector which allow for a greater energy resolution than alpha-particle spectroscopy, however gamma spectroscopy only has an efficiency of a few percent. Gamma spectroscopy is a less sensitive method due to low detector efficiency and high background. However, gamma spectroscopy has the advantage of having less time-consuming sample procedures and portable detectors for field use.

=== Mass Spectrometry ===
Mass spec techniques are essential in nuclear forensics analysis. Mass spec can provide elemental and isotopic information. Mass spec also requires less sample mass relative to counting techniques. For nuclear forensic purposes it is essential that the mass spectrometry offers excellent resolution in order to distinguish between similar analytes, e.g. ^{235}U and ^{236}U. Ideally, mass spec should offer excellent resolution/mass abundance, low backgrounds, and proper instrumental function.

==== Thermal Ionization MS ====
In thermal ionization mass spectrometry, small quantities of highly purified analyte are deposited onto a clean metal filament. Rhenium or tungsten are typically used. The sample is heated in a vacuum of the ion source by applying a current to the filaments. A portion of the analyte will be ionized by the filament and then are directed down the flight tube and separated based on mass to charge ratios. Major disadvantages include time-consuming sample preparation and inefficient analyte ionization.

==== Multi-Collector Inductively Coupled Plasma-Mass Spectrometry ====
This is a frequently used technique in nuclear forensics. In this technique a purified sample is nebulized in a spray chamber and then aspirated into a plasma. The high temperature of the plasma leads to sample dissociation and high efficiency of ionization of the analyte. The ions then enter the mass spectrometer where they are discriminated based on mass based on a double focusing system. Ions of various masses are detected simultaneously by a bank of detectors similar to those used in the thermal ionization mass spec. MC-ICP-MS has a more rapid analysis because it does not require lengthy filament preparation. For high quality, however, there is a requirement for extensive sample cleanup. Argon plasma is also less stable and requires relatively expensive equipment as well as skilled operators.

==== Secondary-Ion MS ====
SIMS is a micro-analytical technique valuable for three-dimensional analysis of a materials elemental composition and isotopic ratios. This method can be utilized in characterization of bulk materials with a detection limit in the low parts per billion (10^{−9} or ng/g) range. Particles as small as a few hundreds of nanometers can be detected. Ion production in this technique is dependent on the bombardment of solid samples with a focused beam of primary ions. The sputtered, secondary ions are directed onto the mass spectrometry system to be measured. The secondary ions are a result of kinetic energy transfer from the primary ions. These primary ions penetrate into the solid sample to some depth. This method can be used to detect any element, however the sputtering process is highly matrix dependent and ion yields vary.

This method is especially useful, because it can be fully automated to find uranium particles in a sample of many million particles in a matter of hours. Particles of interest can then be imaged and further analyzed with very high isotopic precision.

=== Additional Nuclear Forensic Methods ===
Numerous additional approaches may be employed in the interrogation of seized nuclear material. In contrast to previously mentioned analysis techniques, these approaches have received relatively low attention in recent years in terms of novel advancement, and, typically, require greater quantities of sample.

==== Scanning electron microscope ====
The scanning electron microscope can provide images of an object's surface at high magnification with a resolution on the order of nanometers. A focused beam of energetic electrons is scanned over the sample and electrons that are backscattered or emitted from the sample surface are detected. Images are constructed via measuring the fluctuations of electrons from the sample beam scanning position. This data is useful in determining what process may have been employed in the materials production and to distinguish between materials of differing origins. Measurement of backscattered electrons elucidate the average atomic number of the area being scanned. The emitted, or secondary electrons provide topological information. This is a relatively straight forward technique, however samples must be amenable to being under a vacuum and may require pre-treatment.

==== X-Ray Fluorescence ====
X-ray fluorescence offers rapid and non-destructive determination of the elemental composition of a nuclear material based on the detection of characteristic X-rays. Direct sample irradiation allows for minimal sample preparation and portable instrumentation for field deployment. The detection limit is 10 ppm. This is well above mass spectrometry. This technique tends to be hindered by matrix affects, which must be corrected for.

==== Neutron Activation Analysis ====
Neutron activation analysis is a powerful non-destructive method of analyzing elements of mid to high atomic number. This method combines excitation by nuclear reaction and the radiation counting techniques to detect various materials. The measurement of characteristic radiation, following the bombardment completion, is indicative of the elements of interest. The equation for the production product is given by: $A + n \to B^{*} + \gamma$ where $A$ is the starting analyte, $n$ is the incoming neutron, $B^{*}$ is the excited product and $\gamma$ is the detected radiation that results from the de-excitation of the product species.

The advantages of this technique include multi-element analysis, excellent sensitivity, and high selectivity, and no time-consuming separation procedures. One disadvantage is the requirement of a nuclear reactor for sample preparation.

==== X-Ray Absorption Spectroscopy ====
X-Ray absorption spectroscopy (XAS) has been demonstrated as a technique for nuclear forensic investigations involving uranium speciation. Both the lower energy near-edge (XANES) and higher energy fine structure (EXAFS) analytical methods may be useful for this type of characterisation. Typically, XANES is employed to determine the oxidation state of the absorbing uranium atom, while EXAFS can be used to determine its local atomic environment. This spectroscopic method, when coupled with X-Ray diffraction (XRD), would be of most benefit to complex nuclear forensic investigations involving species of different oxidation states.

==== Objective Colour Analysis ====
Objective colour analysis can be performed using digital images taken with a digital camera, either in the field or in a laboratory. This method was developed to replace subjective colour reporting, such as by-eye observations, with quantitative RGB and HSV values. The method has previously been demonstrated on the thermal treatment of uranyl peroxide powders, which yield distinctive yellow to brown hues. Hence, this method is noted as particularly useful in determining thermal processing history, especially where colour changes occur in uranium compounds of various oxidation states.
