= Hefei Institutes of Physical Science =

Chinese Government Institute

- Research type: Research
- Field of research: Physical science Chemical science Environmental science Energy science
- Director: Kuang, Guang-Li
- Staff: 2,500+
- Address: 350 Shushanhu Road, Hefei 230031, Anhui, P. R. China
- Location: Hefei, Anhui, China
- Affiliations: Chinese Academy of Sciences
- Website: english.hf.cas.cn

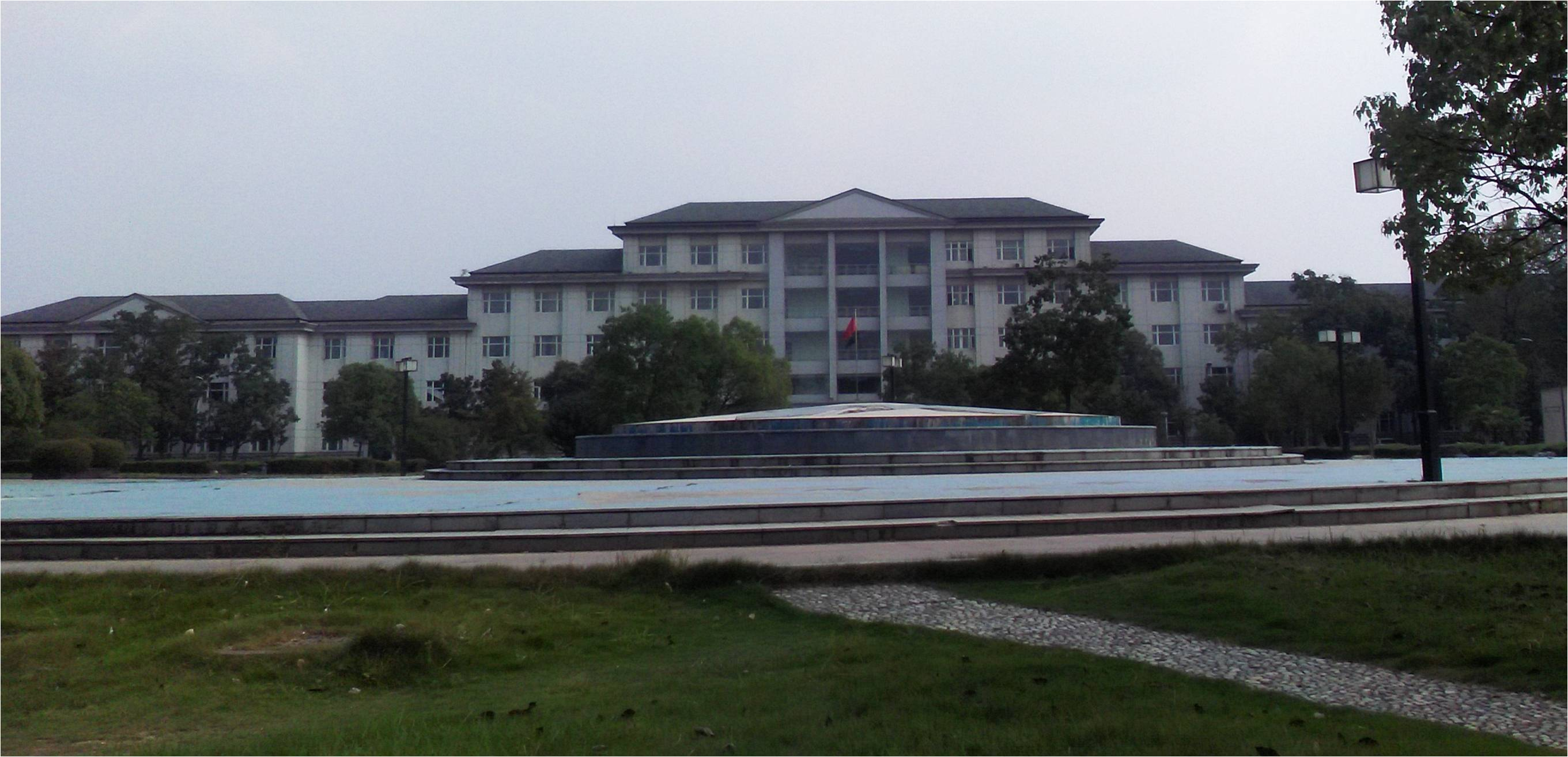
Administrative Building of the Hefei Institutes of Physical Science

The Hefei Institutes of Physical Science of the Chinese Academy of Sciences (CASHIPS, simplified Chinese: 合肥物质科学研究院; traditional Chinese: 合肥物質科學研究院; pinyin: Héféi Wùzhì Kēxué Yánjiūyuàn) is a large-scaled integrated research center in Hefei, China. The inception of CASHIPS involved the integration of several existing institutes that were all under the Chinese Academy of Sciences (CAS) umbrella and situated in Hefei. Its current headquarters are located on a peninsula near Shushan Lake in the northwestern suburbs of Hefei. Apart from its 10 research units (listed below) CASHIPS is also home to 21 key laboratories and research centers that belong to either CAS or are at the national or provincial level such as the Magnetic Confinement Fusion Laboratory; the National Engineering Research Center for Environmental Optical Instrumentation; the National "863" Key Laboratory of Atmospheric Optics; and the CAS Key Laboratory of Material Physics.

Several large-scaled facilities are currently under construction which include:

- the Experimental Advanced Superconducting Tokamak (EAST) project designed for nuclear fusion experiments;
- an atmospheric optics and integrated remote sensing radiometric calibration testing site;
- steady-state high magnetic field facilities;
- an ion beam irradiation system with single-cell positioning precision;
- an SMA microscopy system under high magnetic fields;
- a 9.4T MRI system for large-sized animals;
- an absolute low-temperature radiometric calibration system;
- a kilometer-length, high-res, high-sensitivity atmospheric absorption spectral system; and
- a high-performance computer system with peak computing speeds of 150 billion operations per second.

== Research Units ==
- Institute of Plasma Physics (IPP)
- Institute of Solid State Physics (ISSP)
- Anhui Institute of Optics and Fine Mechanics (AIOFM)
- Hefei Institute of Intelligent Machines (IIM)
- High Magnetic Field Laboratory (HMFL)
- Anhui Academy of Recycling Economical and Technical Engineering (in Chinese)
- Institute of Technical Biology and Agricultural Engineering
- Institute of Advanced Manufacturing Technology
- Center of Medical Physics and Technology (in Chinese)
- Institute of Nuclear Energy Safety Technology

== Publications ==
The Institute of Plasma Physics publishes the journal of Plasma Science and Technology (PST) hosted by IOP publishing. PST covers novel experimental and theoretical studies in all fields related to plasma physics.

Other journals published by CASHIP include: Pattern Recognition and Artificial Intelligence; Chinese Journal of Quantum Electronics; Journal of Atmospheric and Environmental Optics; and the International Journal of Information Acquisition.
