= Qian Sanqiang =

Chinese nuclear physicist (1913–1992)

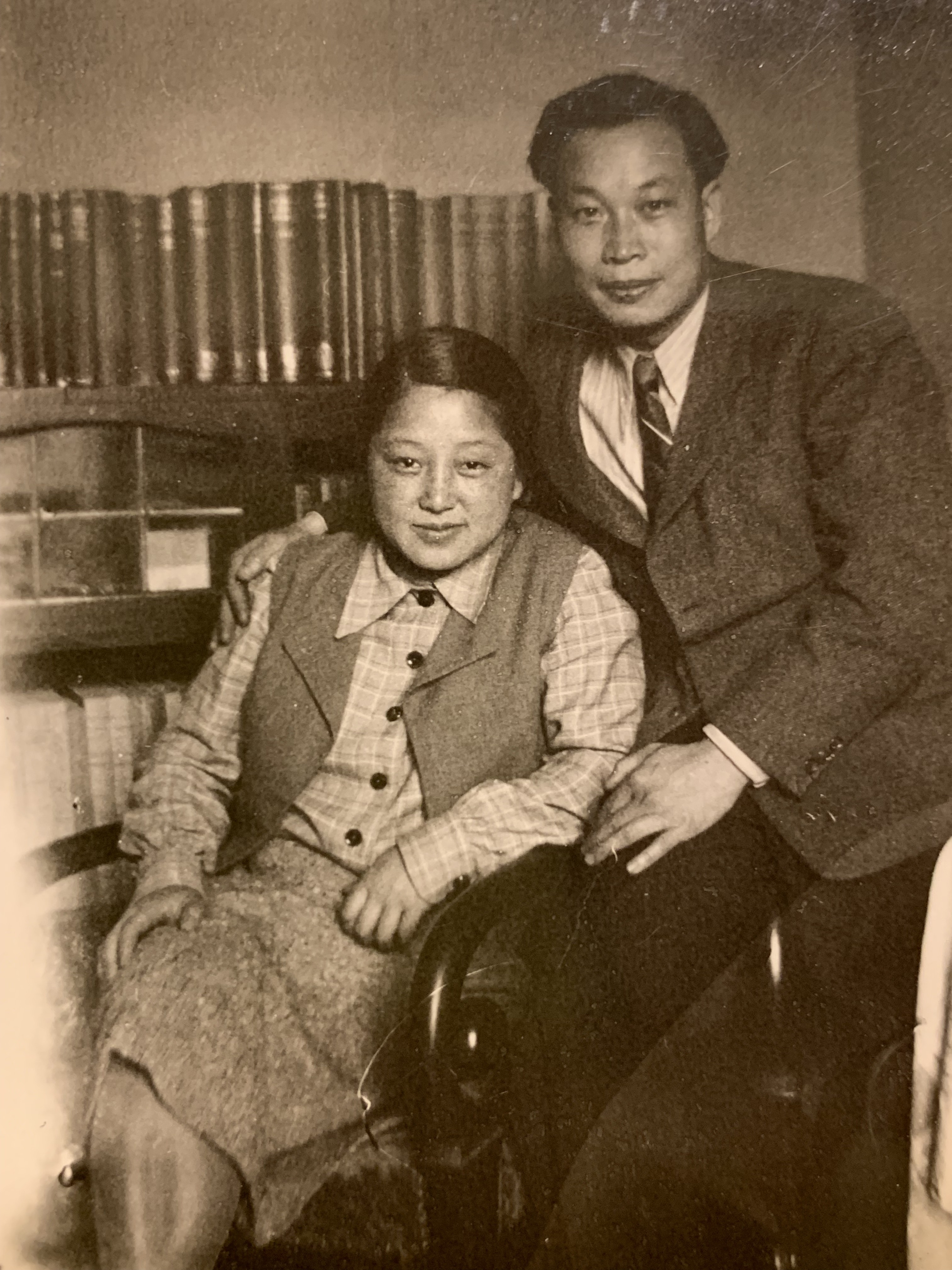
Just married. Qian Sanqiang and He Zehui in Paris, 1947

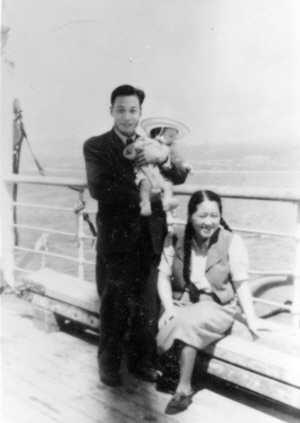
Qian Sanqiang and He Zehui on their return to China in 1948

Qian Sanqiang (simplified Chinese: 钱三强; traditional Chinese: 錢三強; October 16, 1913 – June 28, 1992), also known as Tsien San-Tsiang, was a Chinese nuclear physicist and among the leading scientists of the Two Bombs, One Satellite program. Due to his central role in the development of China's nuclear industry and nuclear weapons program, he is referred to as the "father of China's atomic bomb". Coincidentally, China's first atomic bomb test was conducted on Qian's 51st birthday.

== Biography ==
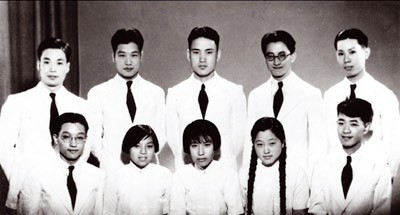
The 1936 graduation class of the physics department at Tsinghua University. He Zehui (Ho Zah-wei) is at the front, second from right; Qian Sanqiang is at the back, far left.

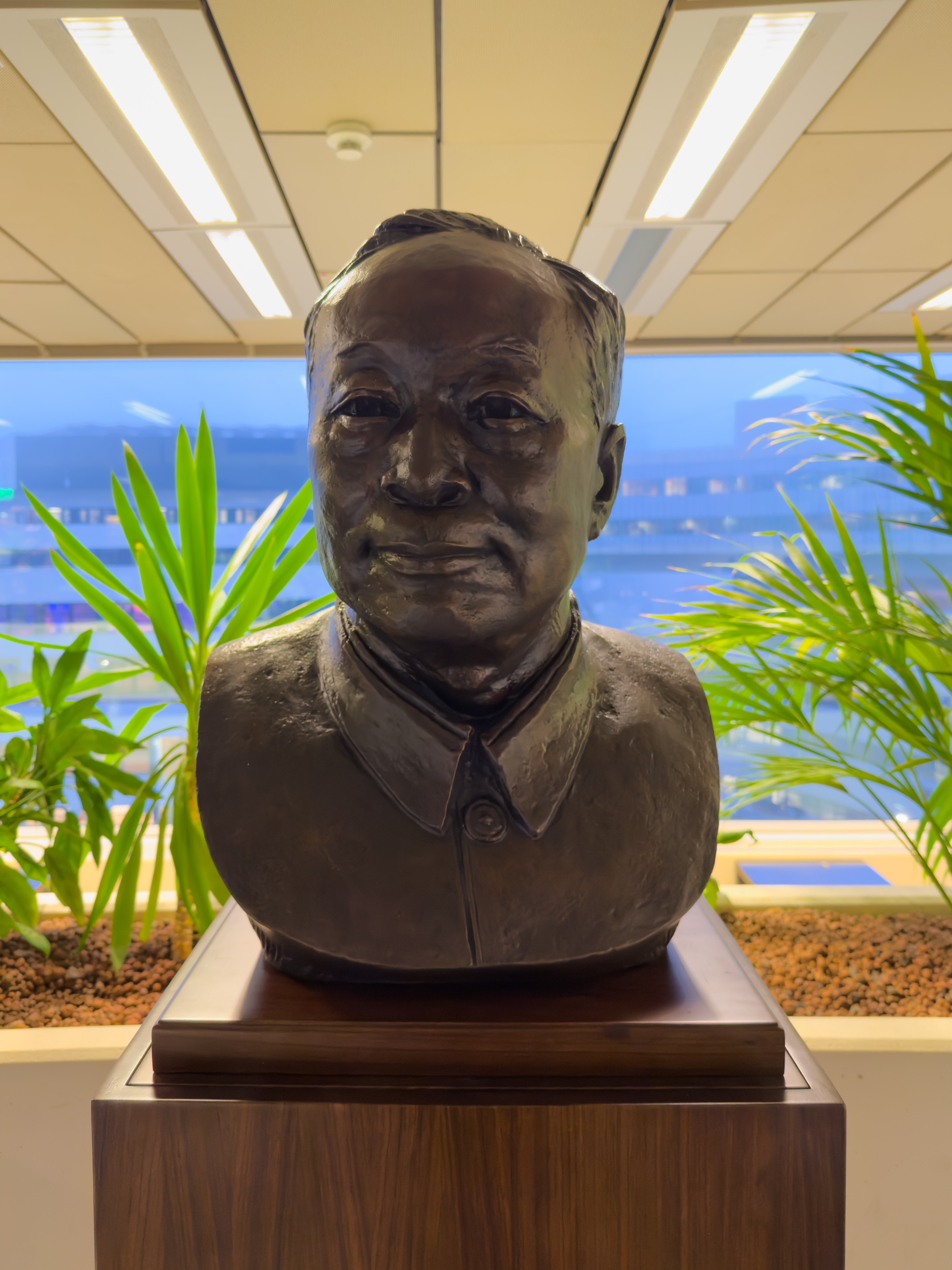
Bust at the UN Vienna International Centre

A native of Huzhou, Zhejiang Province, China, Qian was born in Shaoxing, the son of the scholar Qian Xuantong. Qian attended Peking University and Tsinghua University, graduating in 1936 in the same class as his future wife He Zehui. Qian went to France in 1937. He studied in the Collège de Sorbonne and Collège de France, doing research under Frédéric Joliot-Curie and Irène Joliot-Curie. He obtained the French doctorate in 1940. He was also doctoral advisor of Henriette Mathieu-Faraggi.

Qian returned to China in 1948 with his wife, the nuclear physicist He Zehui, where he took up a professorship at the Tsinghua University and in 1950 founded the Institute of Modern Physics of the Chinese Academy of Sciences (CAS), today known as the China Institute of Atomic Energy.

In 1954 he joined the Chinese Communist Party. He served successively as Director of the Institute of Modern Physics under the Chinese Academy of Sciences, Vice-Minister of the Second Ministry of Machine Building, Vice-President of the Chinese Academy of Sciences and honorary Chairman of the China Association for Science and Technology.

Qian made outstanding contributions to the establishment of nuclear science in the People's Republic of China and to the development of the PRC's atomic and hydrogen bombs under the Two Bombs, One Satellite program. In 1999, he and 22 other Chinese scientists and technologists who had made significant contributions to the program were awarded the Two Bombs, One Satellite Meritorious Service Award Medal (Chinese: 两弹一星功勋奖章).

During the Cultural Revolution, Qian was deported to the countryside for "socialist re-education," due to suspicion aroused by his participation in the Nationalist government's delegation to a UNESCO conference in 1946.

After the end of the Cultural Revolution, Qian was appointed to become a member of the Chinese Academy of Sciences. He was also permitted to resume his work in the atomic energy industry.

Academic offices
Preceded by Chen Weida	President of Zhejiang University; 1979–1982	Succeeded by Yang Shilin
