= Chi Nyok Wang =

Chinese educator

- 王季玉
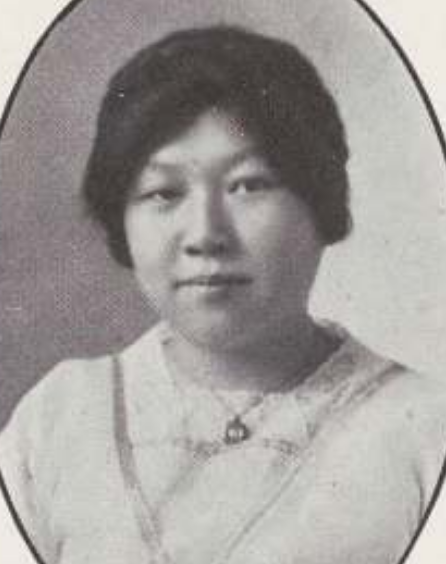
- Chi Nyok Wang, from the 1916 yearbook of Mount Holyoke College
- Born: 1885; Suzhou, China
- Died: 1967 (aged 81–82)
- Other names: Wang Jiyu, Wang Chi-yueh
- Occupations: Educator, school principal
- Relatives: Chi Che Wang (sister)

Chi Nyok Wang (王季玉) (1885–1967), also known as Wang Jiyu, was a Chinese educator, principal of the Tsunghua School for Girls (振華女學校) in Suzhou from 1926 to 1958. She was one of the first two Chinese students at Mount Holyoke College.

== Early life and education ==
Wang was born in Suzhou, China, one of the five daughters of a government official father, Wang Songwie, and a social reformer mother, Wangxie Changda(王謝長達). Her sister, Chi Che Wang, attended Wellesley College and stayed in the United States to make a career as a biochemist.

Wang attended Mount Holyoke College, as one of the school's first two Chinese students, alongside her classmate Yau Tsit Law. Law and Wang were officers of the school's small Chinese Students' Club. She completed a bachelor's degree in 1916.

In 1917, she earned a master's degree in botany at the University of Illinois, with a thesis titled "Revegetation and Plant Succession along Salt Fork Creek". Her thesis advisor was plant ecologist Walter Byron McDougall.

== Career ==
From 1926 to 1958, Wang was principal of the Tsunghua School for Girls in Suzhou, a Christian school founded by her mother in 1906, though she was offered teaching and administrative positions at other prestigious Chinese institutions. Her sisters Wang Jizhao and Wang Jichang also worked at the school. Boys sometimes attended the school, including anthropologist and sociologist Fei Xiaotong.

In 1925 Wang attended the Conference on American Relations with China, held in Baltimore. She was a member of the Institute of Pacific Relations when it met in Honolulu in 1925. In 1949 she was again in the United States, to study at Teachers College, Columbia University and the University of Chicago.

== Personal life ==
Wang died in 1967, in her eighties. Her school is now known as Suzhou No.10 Middle School.
