= Chi Che Wang =

Chinese biochemist (1894–1979)

- 王季茝
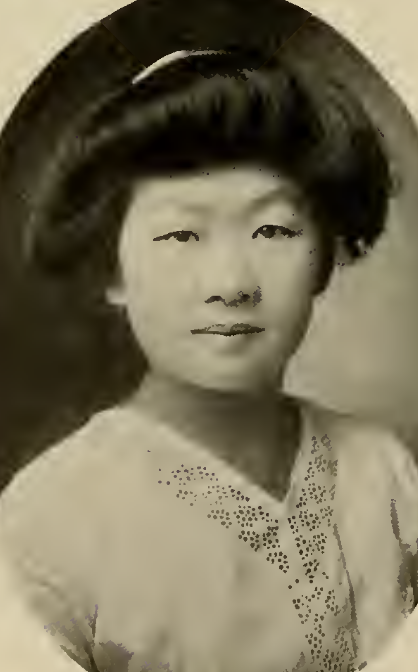
- Chi Che Wang, from the 1914 yearbook of Wellesley College
- Born: October 3, 1894; Suzhou, China
- Died: October 10, 1979 (aged 85); Topeka, Kansas, United States
- Other name: Wang Chi-lian
- Occupations: Biochemist, college professor, hospital researcher
- Relatives: Chi Nyok Wang (sister)

Chi Che Wang (Chinese: 王季茝; October 3, 1894 – October 10, 1979), also known as Wang Chi-Lian, was a Chinese biochemist and college professor. Wang was one of the first Chinese women to make a career in American higher education and scientific research.

== Early life and education ==
Wang was born in Suzhou, one of the five daughters of a government official father, Wong Song-Wei, and a social reformer(women's rights/young girl equal education movement) mother, Wangxie Changda (王謝長達). She was a member of "the first batch of women students the Chinese government has ever sent abroad". She attended the Laura Haygood School in Suzhou, spent two years at a girls' school in Japan, prepared for college at the Walnut Hill School in Massachusetts, and graduated from Wellesley College in 1914, one of the school's earliest Asian alumnae. She earned a master's degree (1916) and a Ph.D. (1918) in chemistry and nutrition, from the University of Chicago, with a dissertation titled "Chemistry of Chinese Preserved Eggs and Chinese Edible Birds' Nests". She had a postdoctoral appointment at Johns Hopkins University.

Her sister Chi Nyok Wang attended Mount Holyoke College and returned to China, where she was principal of a girls' school in Suzhou.

== Career ==
Wang taught at the University of Chicago during and after her doctoral studies, and is considered the first Chinese woman to serve on the faculty of an American college. She was head of medical research at Michael Reese Hospital from 1920 to 1930. In the 1930s she worked at the children's hospital of the University of Cincinnati, on projects involving childhood metabolism, and in the 1940s she worked briefly for the Northwestern Yeast Company. She returned to academia from 1943 to 1946, as an assistant professor of physiology at Northwestern University Medical School. After a few years, she took a position with the Mayo Clinic. She was back at Northwestern University from 1950 to 1953, as associate professor biochemistry.

From 1947 to 1954 Wang was associated with the metabolic laboratory at Hines Veterans Administration Hospital. At a Veterans Administration laboratory in Topeka after 1954, she was co-leader of studies on "Metabolism of Certain Types of Psychiatric Patients", "Effect on Blood Lipids of Orally Administered Detergents", and "A Study on the Influence of Foods on Serum Glutamic Oxalo-acetic Transaminase". She retired in 1961.

Wang was chair of the Chinese students group at Wellesley, and one of the founding members of the Chicago Chinese Women's Club. She was elected to membership in the American Association for the Advancement of Science in 1922. In 1929 she was honored as a "woman leader" by a girls' organization in Chicago. She was a member of the Society for Research in Child Development, the American Society of Biological Chemists and the American Chemical Society. Her research was published in journals including the Archives of Internal Medicine, Journal of Biological Chemistry, Archives of Pediatrics & Adolescent Medicine, and American Journal of Diseases of Children. Her findings were also reported in syndicated news features.

== Selected publications ==
- "Chinese Preserved Eggs; Pidan" (1916, with Katharine Blunt)
- "The Isolation and the Nature of the Amino Sugar of Chinese Edible Birds' Nests" (1921)
- "A Comparison of the Metabolism of Some Mineral Constituents of Cow's Milk and of Breast Milk in the Same Infant" (1924, with David B. Witt and Augusta R. Felcher)
- "Studies on the Metabolism of Obesity, II. Basal Metabolism" (1924, with Solomon Strouse and M. Dye)
- "Metabolism of Undernourished Children III. Urinary Nitrogen with Special Reference to Creatinine" (1926, with Ruth Kern and Margaret Frank)
- "Metabolism of Undernourished Children VII. Effect of High and Low Protein Diets on the Nitrogen and Caloric Balance of Undernourished Children" (1928, with Jean E. Hawks and Mildred Kaucher)
- "Minimum Requirement of Calcium and Phosphorus in Children" (1930, with Ruth Kern and Mildred Kaucher)
- "Basal Metabolism of Twenty-One Chinese Children Reared or Born and Reared in the United States" (1932)
- "Improvements in the methods for calcium determination in biological material" (1935)
- "Metabolism of Adolescent Girls, III. The Excretion of Creatinine and Creatine" (1936, with Ida Genther and Corinne Hogden)
- "Basal Metabolism and Preformed and Total Creatinine in Urine of Seventy Children" (1939)

== Personal life ==
Wang became a United States citizen in 1947, under the provisions of the Magnuson Act. She died in 1979, aged 85 years. A park in Chicago was named for Wang in 2004.
