= Alpha particle =

Ionizing radiation particle of two protons and two neutrons

- Alpha decay
- Composition: 2 protons, 2 neutrons
- Statistics: Bosonic
- Symbol: α, α^{2+}, He^{2+}
- Mass: 6.6446573450(21)×10^{−27} kg 4.001506179129(62) Da; 3.7273794118(11) GeV/c^{2}
- Electric charge: +2 e
- Charge radius: 1.6785(21)×10^{−15} m
- Spin: 0 ħ

Alpha particles, also called alpha rays or alpha radiation, consist of two protons and two neutrons bound together into a particle identical to the nucleus of a helium-4 atom. They are generally produced in the process of alpha decay but may also be produced in other ways. Alpha particles are named after the first letter in the Greek alphabet, α. The symbol for the alpha particle is α or α^{2+}. Because they are identical to helium nuclei, they are also sometimes written as He^{2+} or ^{4}_{2}He^{2+} indicating a helium ion with a +2 charge (missing its two electrons). Once the ion gains electrons from its environment, the alpha particle becomes a normal (electrically neutral) helium atom ^{4}_{2}He.

Alpha particles have a net spin of zero. When produced in standard alpha radioactive decay, alpha particles generally have a kinetic energy of about 5 MeV and a velocity in the vicinity of 4% of the speed of light. They are a highly ionizing form of particle radiation, with low penetration depth (stopped by a few centimetres of air, or by the skin).

However, so-called long-range alpha particles from ternary fission are three times as energetic and penetrate three times as far. The helium nuclei that form 10–12% of cosmic rays are also usually of much higher energy than those produced by nuclear decay processes, and thus may be highly penetrating and able to traverse the human body and also many metres of dense solid shielding, depending on their energy. To a lesser extent, this is also true of very high-energy helium nuclei produced by particle accelerators.

== Name ==
The term "alpha particle" was coined by Ernest Rutherford in reporting his studies of the properties of uranium radiation. The radiation appeared to have two different characters, the first he called "$\alpha$ radiation" and the more penetrating one he called "$\beta$ radiation". After five years of additional experimental work, Rutherford and Hans Geiger determined that "the alpha particle, after it has lost its positive charge, is a Helium atom". Most terrestrial helium gas (^{4}He) derives from the alpha particle radioactive decay of thorium and uranium followed by electron gain from surrounding matter.

== Sources ==
=== Alpha decay ===
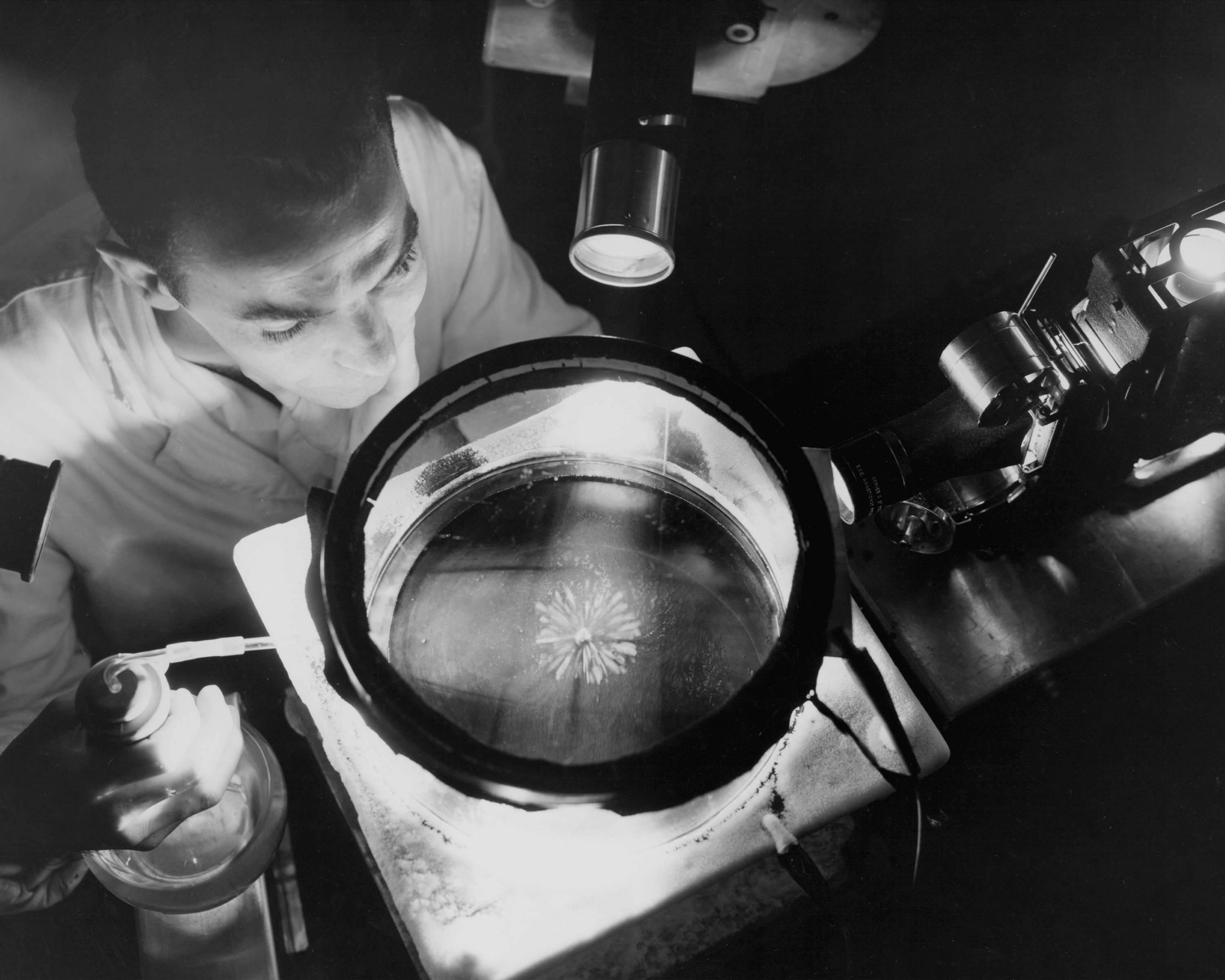
A physicist observes alpha particles from the decay of a polonium source in a cloud chamber

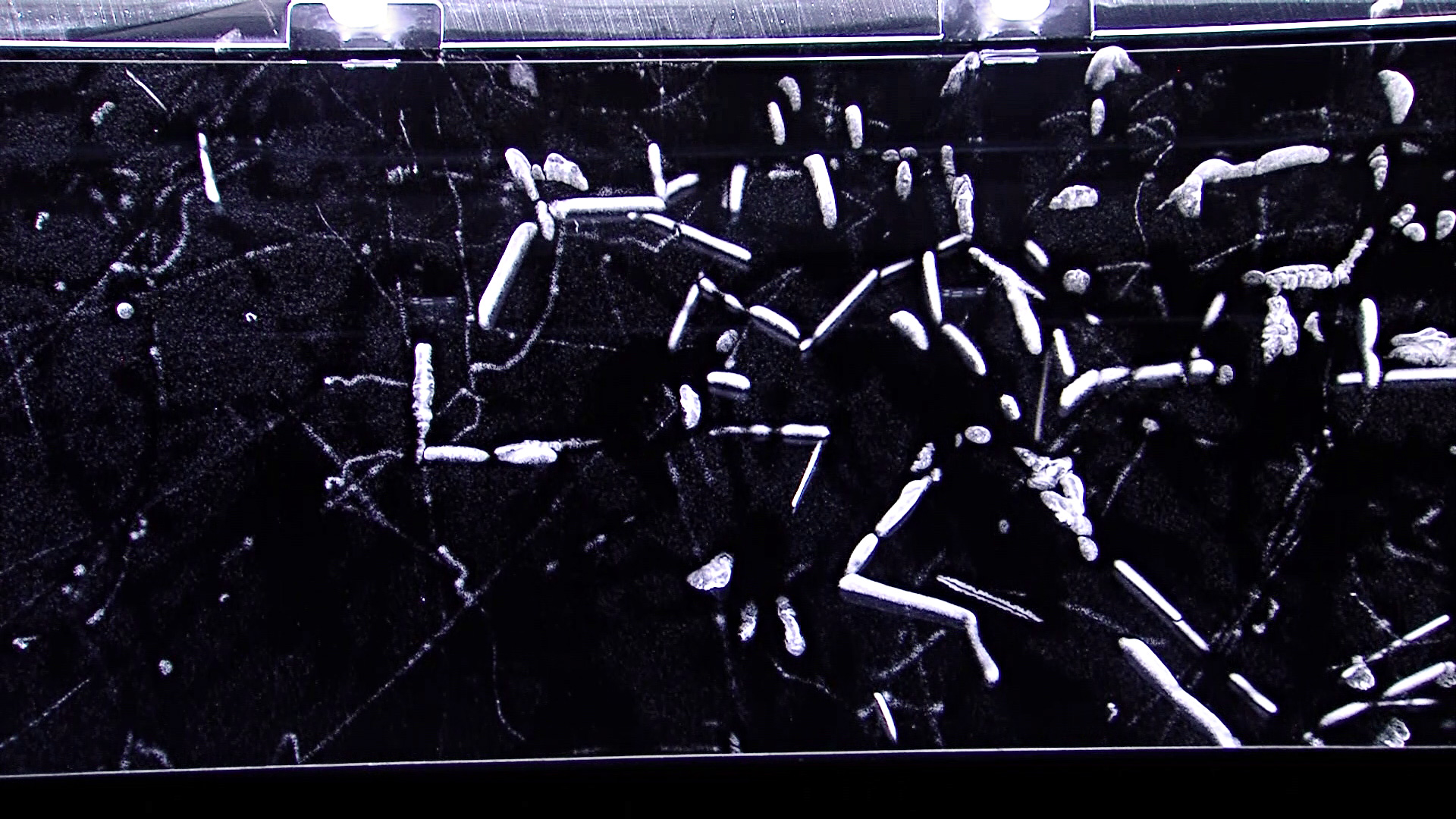
Alpha radiation detected in an isopropanol cloud chamber (after injection of an artificial source radon-220)

The best-known source of alpha particles is alpha decay of heavier (mass number of at least 104) atoms. When an atom emits an alpha particle in alpha decay, the atom's mass number decreases by four due to the loss of the four nucleons in the alpha particle. The atomic number of the atom goes down by two, as a result of the loss of two protons – the atom becomes a new element. Examples of this sort of nuclear transmutation by alpha decay are the decay of uranium to thorium, and that of radium to radon.

Alpha particles are commonly emitted by all of the larger radioactive nuclei such as uranium, thorium, actinium, and radium, as well as the transuranic elements. Unlike other types of decay, alpha decay as a process must have a minimum-size atomic nucleus that can support it. The smallest nuclei that have to date been found to be capable of alpha emission are beryllium-8 and tellurium-104, not counting beta-delayed alpha emission of some lighter elements. The alpha decay sometimes leaves the parent nucleus in an excited state; the emission of a gamma ray then removes the excess energy.

==== Mechanism of production in alpha decay ====
In contrast to beta decay, the fundamental interactions responsible for alpha decay are a balance between the electromagnetic force and nuclear force. Alpha decay results from the Coulomb repulsion between the alpha particle and the rest of the nucleus, which both have a positive electric charge, but which is kept in check by the nuclear force. In classical physics, alpha particles do not have enough energy to escape the potential well from the strong force inside the nucleus (this well involves escaping the strong force to go up one side of the well, which is followed by the electromagnetic force causing a repulsive push-off down the other side).

However, the quantum tunnelling effect allows alphas to escape even though they do not have enough energy to overcome the nuclear force. This is allowed by the wave nature of matter, which allows the alpha particle to spend some of its time in a region so far from the nucleus that the potential from the repulsive electromagnetic force has fully compensated for the attraction of the nuclear force. From this point, alpha particles can escape.

=== Ternary fission ===
Especially energetic alpha particles deriving from a nuclear process are produced in the relatively rare (one in a few hundred) nuclear fission process of ternary fission. In this process, three charged particles are produced from the event instead of the normal two, with the smallest of the charged particles most probably (90% probability) being an alpha particle. Such alpha particles are termed "long range alphas" since at their typical energy of 16 MeV, they are at far higher energy than is ever produced by alpha decay. Ternary fission happens in both neutron-induced fission (the nuclear reaction that happens in a nuclear reactor), and also when fissionable and fissile actinides nuclides (i.e., heavy atoms capable of fission) undergo spontaneous fission as a form of radioactive decay. In both induced and spontaneous fission, the higher energies available in heavy nuclei result in long range alphas of higher energy than those from alpha decay.

=== Accelerators ===
Energetic helium nuclei (helium ions) may be produced by cyclotrons, synchrotrons, and other particle accelerators. Convention is that they are not normally referred to as "alpha particles".

=== Solar core reactions ===
Helium nuclei may participate in nuclear reactions in stars, and occasionally and historically these have been referred to as alpha reactions (see triple-alpha process and alpha process).

=== Cosmic rays ===
In addition, extremely high energy helium nuclei sometimes referred to as alpha particles make up about 10 to 12% of cosmic rays. The mechanisms of cosmic ray production continue to be debated.

== Energy and absorption ==
Example selection of radioactive nuclides with main emitted alpha particle energies plotted against their atomic number. Each nuclide has a distinct alpha spectrum.

The energy of the alpha particle emitted in alpha decay is mildly dependent on the half-life for the emission process, with many orders of magnitude differences in half-life being associated with energy changes of less than 50%, shown by the Geiger–Nuttall law.

The energy of alpha particles emitted varies, with higher energy alpha particles being emitted from larger nuclei, but most alpha particles have energies of between 3 and 7 MeV (megaelectronvolt), corresponding to extremely long and extremely short half-lives of alpha-emitting nuclides, respectively. The energies and ratios are often distinct and can be used to identify specific nuclides as in alpha spectrometry.

With a typical kinetic energy of 5 MeV; the speed of emitted alpha particles is 15000 km/s, which is 5% of the speed of light. This energy is a substantial amount of energy for a single particle, but their high mass means alpha particles have a lower speed than any other common type of radiation, e.g. β particles, neutrons.

Because of their charge and large mass, alpha particles are easily absorbed by materials, and they can travel only a few centimetres in air. They can be absorbed by tissue paper or by the outer layers of human skin. They typically penetrate skin about 40 micrometres, equivalent to a few cells deep.

== Biological effects ==
Due to the short range of absorption and inability to penetrate the outer layers of skin, alpha particles are not, in general, dangerous to life unless the source is ingested or inhaled. Because of this high mass and strong absorption, if alpha-emitting radionuclides do enter the body (upon being inhaled, ingested, or injected, as with the use of Thorotrast for high-quality X-ray images prior to the 1950s), alpha radiation is the most destructive form of ionizing radiation. It is the most strongly ionizing, and with large enough doses can cause any or all of the symptoms of radiation poisoning. It is estimated that chromosome damage from alpha particles is anywhere from 10 to 1000 times greater than that caused by an equivalent amount of gamma or beta radiation, with the average being set at 20 times. A study of European nuclear workers exposed internally to alpha radiation from plutonium and uranium found that when relative biological effectiveness is considered to be 20, the carcinogenic potential (in terms of lung cancer) of alpha radiation appears to be consistent with that reported for doses of external gamma radiation i.e. a given dose of alpha-particles inhaled presents the same risk as a 20-times higher dose of gamma radiation. The powerful alpha emitter polonium-210 (a milligram of ^{210}Po emits as many alpha particles per second as 4.215 grams of ^{226}Ra) is suspected of playing a role in lung cancer and bladder cancer related to tobacco smoking. ^{210}Po was used to kill Russian dissident and ex-FSB officer Alexander V. Litvinenko in 2006.

== History of discovery and use ==
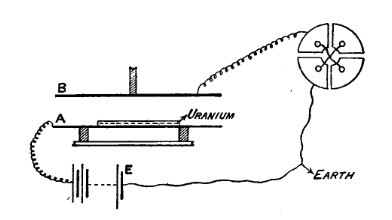
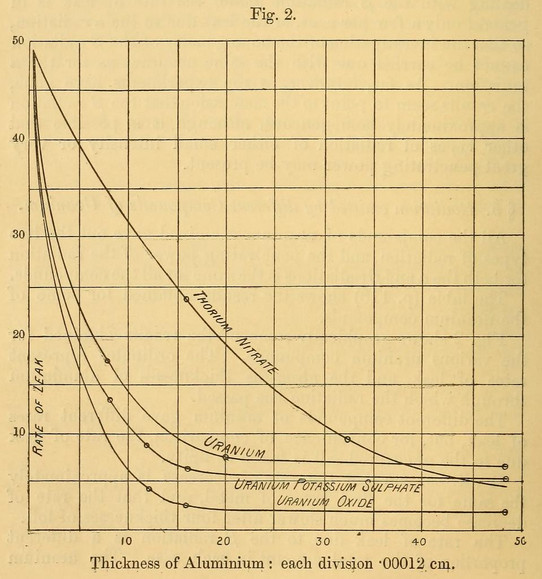
Figure 1 and 2 from Rutherford's 1899 paper on uranium radiation. The uranium radiation ionized the air between the electrodes A and B, creating a current. At first the current steadily dropped as Rutherford placed layer after layer of aluminium foil over the uranium, but past 20 micrometers of thickness the current remained more or less the same.

In 1896, Henri Becquerel discovered that uranium emits an invisible radiation that can darken photographic plates, and that this mystery radiation wasn't phosphorescence. In 1898, Marie Curie showed that this phenomenon, which she called "radioactivity", was not unique to uranium and was a property of individual atoms. Ernest Rutherford studied uranium radiation and discovered that it could ionize gas particles.

In 1899, Rutherford discovered that uranium radiation is a mixture of two types of radiation. He performed an experiment which involved two electrodes separated by 4 cm of air. He placed some uranium on the bottom electrode, and the radiation from the uranium ionized the air between the electrodes, creating a current. Rutherford then placed an aluminium foil (5 micrometers thick) over the uranium and noticed that the current dropped a bit, indicating that the foil was absorbing some of the uranium's radiation. Rutherford placed a few more foils over the uranium and found that, for the first four foils, the current steadily decreased at a geometric rate. However, after the fourth layer of foil over the uranium, the current didn't drop anymore and remained more or less level for up to twelve layers of foil. This result indicated that uranium radiation has two components. Rutherford dubbed one component "alpha radiation" which was fully absorbed by just a few layers of foil, and what was left was a second component that could penetrate many layers of foil, and he dubbed the latter "beta radiation".

In 1900, Marie Curie noticed that the absorption coefficient of alpha rays seemed to increase the thicker the barrier she placed in their path. This suggested that alpha radiation is not a form of light but made of particles that lose kinetic energy as they pass through barriers. In 1902, Rutherford found that he could deflect alpha rays with a magnetic field and an electric field, showing that alpha radiation is composed of electrically charged particles. The direction in which the alpha particles were deflected was the opposite of cathode rays, which showed that they are positively charged.

In 1906, Rutherford made some more precise measurements of the charge-to-mass ratio of alpha particles. Firstly, he found that the ratio was more or less the same whether the source was radium or actinium, showing that alpha particles are the same regardless of the source. Secondly, he found the charge-to-mass ratio of alpha particles to be half that of the hydrogen ion. Rutherford proposed three explanations: (1) an alpha particle is a hydrogen molecule (H_{2}) with a charge of 1 e; (2) an alpha particle is an atom of helium with a charge of 2 e; (3) an alpha particle is half a helium atom with a charge of 1 e. At that time in history, scientists knew that hydrogen ions have an atomic weight of 1 and a charge of 1 e, and that helium has an atomic weight of 4. Nobody knew exactly how many electrons were in an atom. Protons and neutrons had not yet been discovered. Rutherford decided the second explanation was the most plausible because it is the simplest and sizeable deposits of helium were commonly found underground next to deposits of radioactive elements. His explanation was that as alpha particles are emitted by underground radioactive elements, they become trapped in the rock strata and acquire electrons, becoming helium atoms. Therefore an alpha particle is essentially a helium atom stripped of two electrons.

In 1909, Ernest Rutherford and Thomas Royds finally proved that alpha particles were indeed helium ions. To do this they collected and purified the gas emitted by radium, a known alpha particle emitter, in a glass tube. An electric spark discharge inside the tube produced light. Subsequent study of the spectrum of this light showed that the gas was helium and thus the alpha particles were indeed the helium ions.

In 1911, Rutherford used alpha particle scattering data to argue that the positive charge of an atom is concentrated in a tiny nucleus. In 1913, Antonius van den Broek suggested that the nuclear charge in an atom, and by extension the number of electrons, is equal to its atomic number. Therefore a helium atom has two electrons, and an alpha particle is essentially a helium nucleus. In 1920, Rutherford deduced the existence of the proton as the source of positive charge in the atom. In 1932, James Chadwick discovered the neutron. Thereafter it was known that an alpha particle is an agglomeration of two protons and two neutrons.

== Anti-alpha particle ==
While antimatter equivalents for helium-3 have been known since 1970, it took until 2010 for members of the international STAR collaboration using the Relativistic Heavy Ion Collider at the U.S. Department of Energy's Brookhaven National Laboratory to detect the antimatter partner of the helium-4 nucleus. Like the Rutherford scattering experiments, the antimatter experiment used gold. This time the gold ions moving at nearly the speed of light and colliding head on to produce the antiparticle, also dubbed "anti-alpha" particle.

== Applications ==
=== Devices ===
- Some smoke detectors contain a small amount of the alpha emitter americium-241. The alpha particles ionize air within a small gap. A small current is passed through that ionized air. Smoke particles from fire that enter the air gap reduce the current flow, sounding the alarm. The isotope is extremely dangerous if inhaled or ingested, but the danger is minimal if the source is kept sealed. Many municipalities have established programs to collect and dispose of old smoke detectors, to keep them out of the general waste stream. However the US EPA says they "may be thrown away with household garbage".
- Alpha decay can provide a relatively safe power source for radioisotope thermoelectric generators used for space probes. Alpha decay is much more easily shielded against than other forms of radioactive decay. Plutonium-238, a source of alpha particles, requires only 2.5 mm of lead shielding to protect against unwanted radiation.
- Static eliminators typically use polonium-210, an alpha emitter, to ionize air, allowing the "static cling" to more rapidly dissipate.

=== Cancer treatment ===
Alpha-emitting radionuclides are presently being used in three different ways to eradicate cancerous tumors: as an infusible radioactive treatment targeted to specific tissues (radium-223), as a source of radiation inserted directly into solid tumors (radium-224), and as an attachment to a tumor-targeting molecule, such as an antibody to a tumor-associated antigen.

Radium-223 is an alpha emitter that is naturally attracted to the bone because it is a calcium mimetic. Radium-223 (as radium-223 dichloride) can be infused into a cancer patient's veins, after which it migrates to parts of the bone where there is rapid turnover of cells due to the presence of metastasized tumors. Once within the bone, Ra-223 emits alpha radiation that can destroy tumor cells within a 100-micron distance. This approach has been in use since 2013 to treat prostate cancer which has metastasized to the bone. Radionuclides infused into the circulation are able to reach sites that are accessible to blood vessels. This means, however, that the interior of a large tumor that is not vascularized (i.e. is not well penetrated by blood vessels) may not be effectively eradicated by the radioactivity.

Radium-224 is a radioactive atom that is utilized as a source of alpha radiation in a cancer treatment device called DaRT (diffusing alpha emitters radiation therapy). Each radium-224 atom undergoes a decay process producing 6 daughter atoms. During this process, 4 alpha particles are emitted. The range of an alpha particle—up to 100 microns—is insufficient to cover the width of many tumors. However, radium-224's daughter atoms can diffuse up to 2–3 mm in the tissue, thus creating a "kill region" with enough radiation to potentially destroy an entire tumor, if the seeds are placed appropriately. Radium-224's half-life is short enough at 3.6 days to produce a rapid clinical effect while avoiding the risk of radiation damage due to overexposure. At the same time, the half-life is long enough to allow for handling and shipping the seeds to a cancer treatment center at any location across the globe.

Targeted alpha therapy for solid tumors involves attaching an alpha-particle-emitting radionuclide to a tumor-targeting molecule such as an antibody, that can be delivered by intravenous administration to a cancer patient.

== Alpha radiation and DRAM errors ==
In computer technology, dynamic random access memory (DRAM) "soft errors" were linked to alpha particles in 1978 in Intel's DRAM chips. The discovery led to strict control of radioactive elements in the packaging of semiconductor materials, and the problem is largely considered to be solved.

== See also ==
- Alpha nuclide
- Alpha process (also known as alpha-capture, or the alpha-ladder)
- Beta particle
- Cosmic rays
- Helion, the nucleus of helium-3 rather than helium-4
- List of alpha-emitting nuclides
- Nuclear physics
- Particle physics
- Radioactive isotope
- Rays:
  - β Beta ray
  - γ Gamma ray
  - δ Delta ray
  - ε Epsilon radiation
- Rutherford scattering
