= Suzhou No.10 Middle School =

Coordinates: 31°17′54.88″N 120°38′14.42″E

Suzhou No.10 High School
- 江苏省苏州第十中学
- 8 Xiangwang Road, Canglang, Suzhou, Jiangsu; China

Information
- Type: Public
- Motto: cultivate renowned scholars of the future（诚、朴、仁、勇）
- Established: 1906
- Principal: Liu Yuanzhao(柳袁照)
- Staff: 206
- Enrollment: about 1300 (after Zhenhua Middle School was separated)
- Website: Suzhou No.10 Middle School

Suzhou No.10 high School is a four-star high school in Jiangsu province. It is located in the south-east of Suzhou. It has operated for more than a century.

== History ==
Suzhou No.10 High School was established by Wangxie Changda in 1906 as Zhenhua Girls' High School. Zhang Binglin and Cai Yuanpei once served as school managers. In 1917, Wang Jiyu took charge. Many celebrities taught here, including Zhang Taiyan, Hu Shizhi and Bei Shizhang.

== Scenery ==
Suzhou No.10 High School is regarded as ‘the most Chinese school’. It covers an area of 30,536 square metres (328,690 sq ft), of which 37% is greenery. The West Garden holds the remains of the Weaving Department of the Qing dynasty. Many antiques and monuments are present on campus, such as the Ruiyun Peak, Zhenhua Hall, Weiji Tablet, Jisi Pavilion and the Ninghuai Pavilion.

== Alumni ==
Notable alumni include Fei Xiaotong, Professor He Zehui, Yang Jiang, He Yizhen, Hu Shuqin, Yan Weimin, Wang Shuzhen and Zhu Linan.
