= Institute of Solid State Physics, Chinese Academy of Sciences =

Research institute in Hefei, China

The Institute of Solid State Physics
- 中国科学院固体物理研究所
- Motto: 确實 拓新 求真 恊力
- Type: Government Research Institution
- Established: 1982
- Affiliations: Chinese Academy of Sciences, Hefei Institutes of Physical Science
- Director: Meng, Guo-Wen （孟国文）
- Faculty: 193
- Postgraduates: 200
- Location: Hefei, Anhui, China
- Website: english.issp.ac.cn/index.asp

The Institute of Solid State Physics (ISSP, Chinese: 固体物理研究所; pinyin: Gùtǐ Wùlǐ Yánjiūsuǒ) is one of over a dozen divisions comprising the Hefei Institutes of Physical Science, Chinese Academy of Sciences (CAS) situated in Hefei, Anhui. The ISSP was founded in March 1982 by the renowned scientist couple Ke T'ing-sui and He Yizhen; it now employs over 200 staff members, has combined facilities of over 25,000 square meters of laboratory space, and is a training base to over 200 graduate students in the fields of condensed matter physics, materials physics and chemistry.

The ISSP is research intensive in the areas of nano-materials technology, novel functional materials, computational physics, internal friction and defects of solids, materials physics under extreme environments, environmental and energy nanomaterials, nuclear engineering and special metallic materials. Most of its research is funded by the National Natural Science Foundation of China, the Chinese Academy of Sciences, the Natural Science Foundation of Anhui Province and the private sector. The ISSP also has close ties with the University of Science and Technology of China in both R&D and training of graduate students.

== Research Laboratories ==
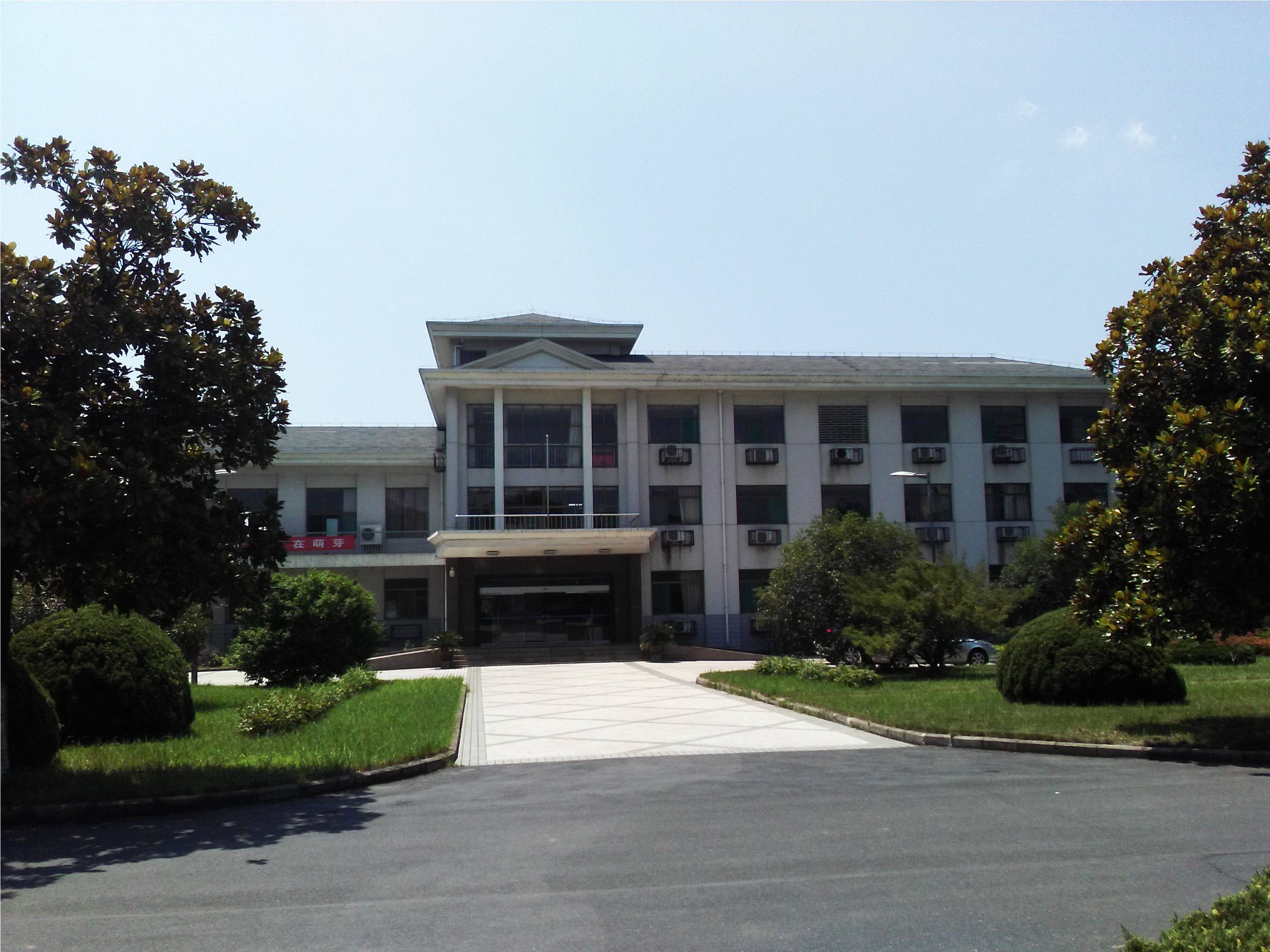
Administrative Building of the ISSP

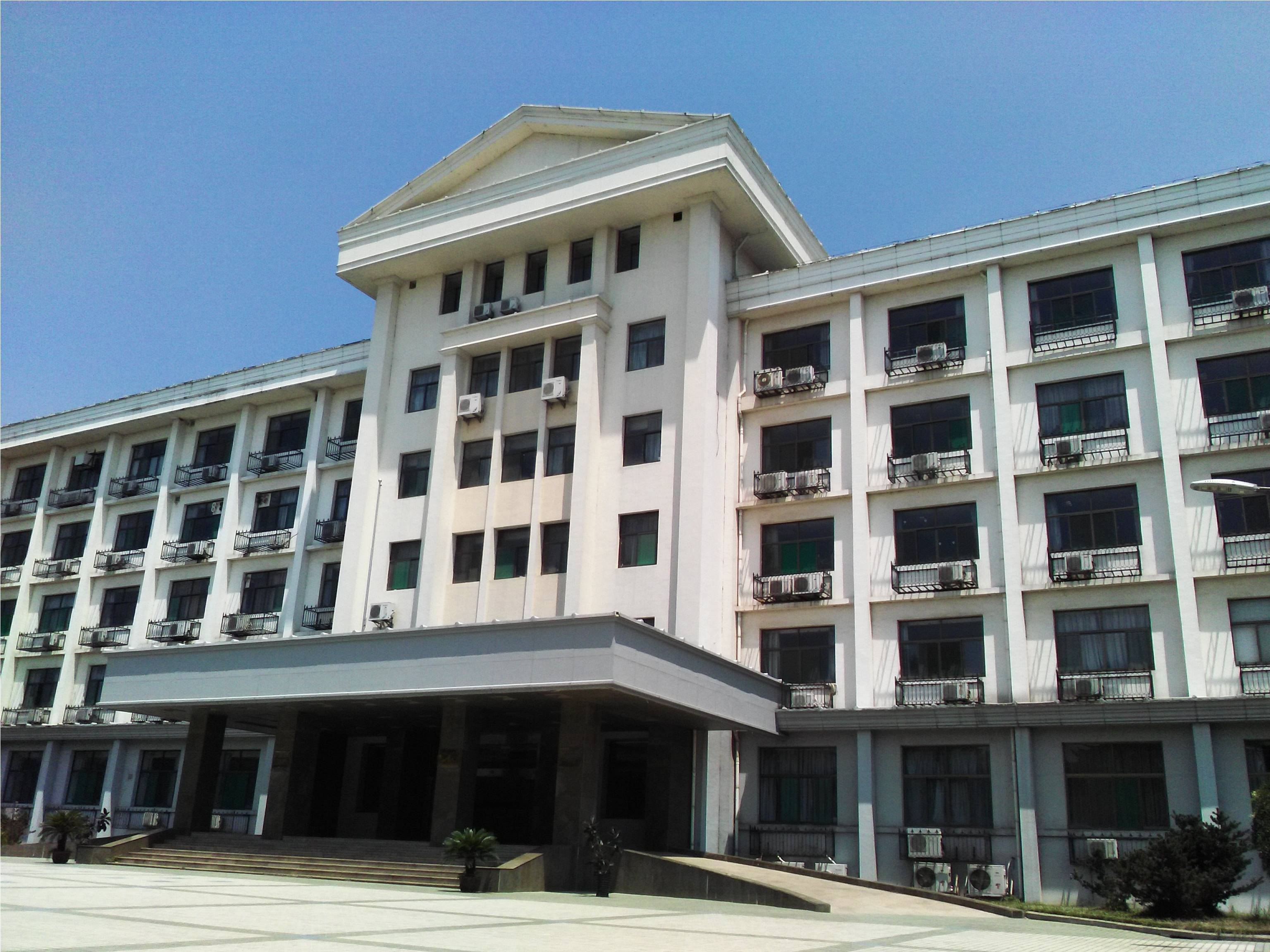
Research Building No. 3

- Laboratory of Internal Friction and Defects in Solids
- Laboratory for Computational Materials Sciences (in Chinese)
- Functional Materials Laboratory (in Chinese)
- Laboratory of Nanomaterials & Nanostructures (in Chinese)
- Applied Technology Laboratory of Materials
- Applied Technology Laboratory of Materials Nanomaterials
- Laboratory of Structure Research (in Chinese)
- Center for Energy Matter in Extreme Environments (in English)
- Center for Environmental and Energy Nanomaterials

== Notable people ==
- T. S. Kê - Pioneered the study of the dynamics of dislocations in solids and founder of the ISSP.
- He Yizhen - Pioneer of studies in amorphous physics and metal glasses in China and co-founder of the ISSP.
- Kong Qingping (孔庆平) - Recipient of the 2014 Zener Medal
