= Plasma Science and Technology =

- Discipline: Plasma physics
- Language: English
- Edited by: Liang Yunfeng

Publication details
- History: 1999–present
- Publisher: IOP Publishing on behalf of the Institute of Plasma Physics, Chinese Academy of Sciences and the Chinese Society of Theoretical and Applied Mechanics (China)
- Frequency: monthly
- Impact factor: 1.6 (2023)

Standard abbreviations
- ISO 4: Plasma Sci. Technol.

Indexing
- ISSN: 1009-0630

Links
- Journal homepage

Plasma Science and Technology is a scientific journal published by the Institute of Plasma Physics, Chinese Academy of Sciences (CAS) and the Chinese Society of Theoretical and Applied Mechanics, hosted by IOP Publishing. It publishes novel experimental and theoretical findings in all fields related to plasma physics. The current editor-in-chief is Yunfeng Liang of the Forschungszentrum Jülich Institute of Energy and Climate Research, Germany.

== See also ==
- Hefei Institutes of Physical Science
