= International Journal of Information Acquisition =

- Discipline: Computer Science
- Language: English

Publication details
- Publisher: World Scientific (Singapore)

Standard abbreviations
- ISO 4: Int. J. Inf. Acquis.

Indexing
- ISSN: 0219-8789 (print); 1793-6985 (web)

Links
- Journal homepage

The International Journal of Information Acquisition was established in 2004 and is published by World Scientific, covering the science and technology of information acquisition. Papers are categorized into Theory, Sensitive Materials and Devices, Sensors, Machine Sensing and Algorithms, Applications, and Reviews. The current Editor-in-Chief is Tao Mei (Hefei Institute of Intelligent Machines, Chinese Academy of Sciences).

== Abstracting and indexing ==
The journal is abstracted and indexed in Inspec.
