= Shenyang Jianzhu University =

University in Shenyang, China

- 沈阳建筑大学
- Established: 1948
- Location: Shenyang, Liaoning, China

Shenyang Jianzhu University (Chinese: 沈阳建筑大学; pinyin: Shěnyáng Jiànzhú Dàxué) is a university in Shenyang, Liaoning, China under the provincial government.
