= White Pagoda of Liaoyang =

Pagoda in Liaoning, China

Coordinates: 41°16′36″N 123°10′08″E

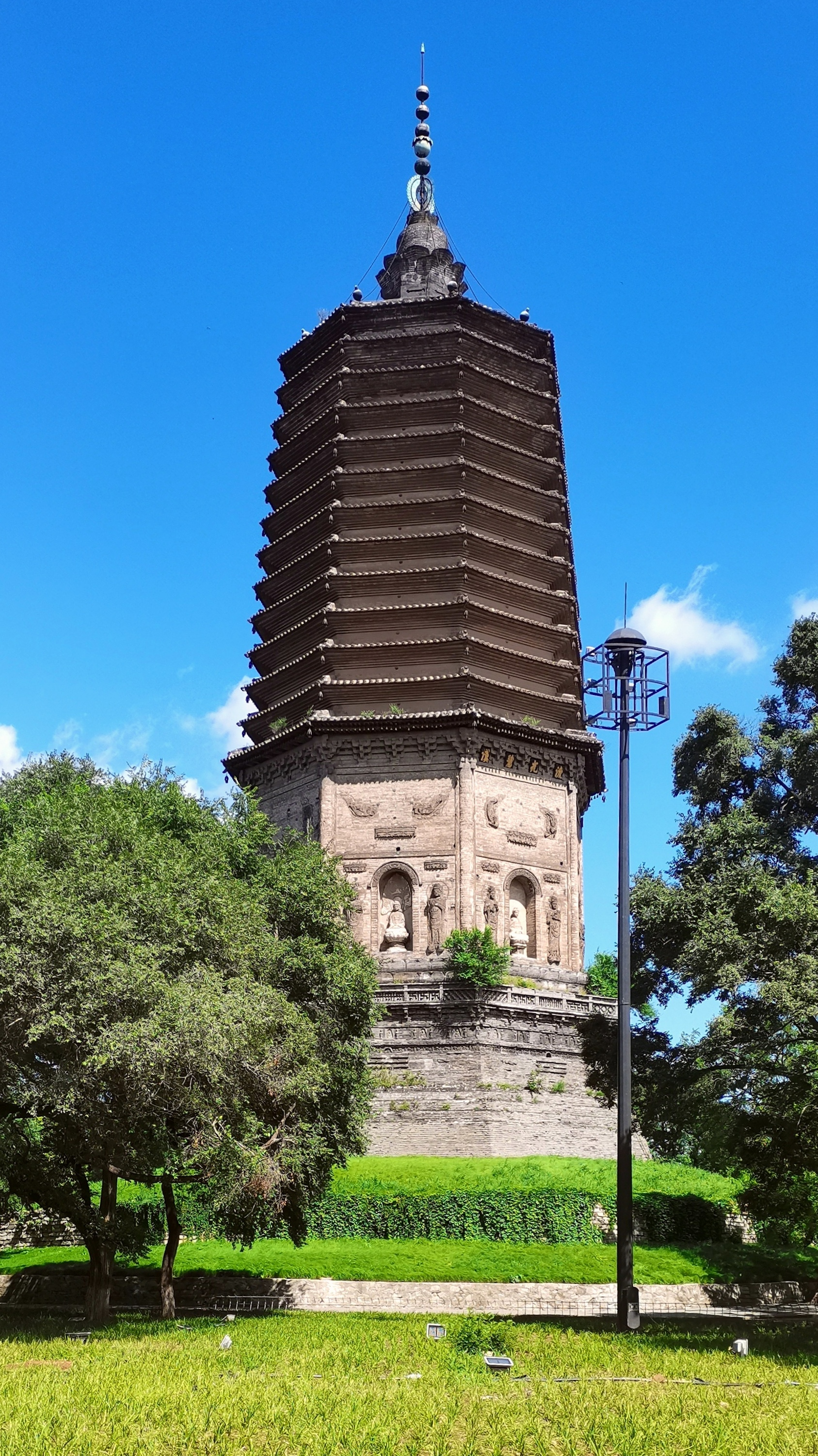
The White Pagoda of Liaoyang

The White Pagoda of Liaoyang (simplified Chinese: 辽阳白塔; traditional Chinese: 遼陽白塔) is a pagoda in Liaoyang, China. The 70.4-metre (231 ft)-tall pagoda is the tallest brick pagoda in Northeast China.

== History ==
Historical records and inscriptions around the tower provided conflicting dates on the pagoda's construction, ranging from the Han dynasty to the Jin dynasty. According to a local legend, the pagoda was built to commemorate the mother of Emperor Shizong of Jin, who became a nun in Liaoyang. However, based on the architectural style of the tower, most researchers now believe that it was constructed during the mid-late Liao dynasty. The White Pagoda was part of the Guangyou Temple (广佑寺), one of the first Buddhist temples in China founded during the Eastern Han dynasty. Therefore, the pagoda is also known as the pagoda of the Guangyou Temple. Liaoyang's Baita District was named after the White Pagoda (Baita).

The temple and the pagoda were renovated on multiple occasions, including in 1313, 1423, 1590, 1635, 1842 and 1989. The temple was burned down by the Russian army in 1900 during the Boxer Rebellion, leaving only the pagoda standing.

== Architecture ==
The pagoda has an octagonal shape and thirteen tiers of eaves. Its interior is solid. The base of the structure is composed of a stone platform and a brick sumeru pedestal. Each of the eight sides of the body of the pagoda contains a niche with statues of a sitting Buddha and two flanking bodhisattvas. Above each niche is a relief of two apsaras. The eaves imitate those of wooden structures by using brackets. The finial includes an octagonal sumeru pedestal, a two-levelled lotus base, an inverted-bowl-shaped base and a 9.5-metre (31 ft)-tall iron shaft. The architectural style resembles other Liao pagodas in Liaoning.
