= Baita District =

Baita 白塔区
- District
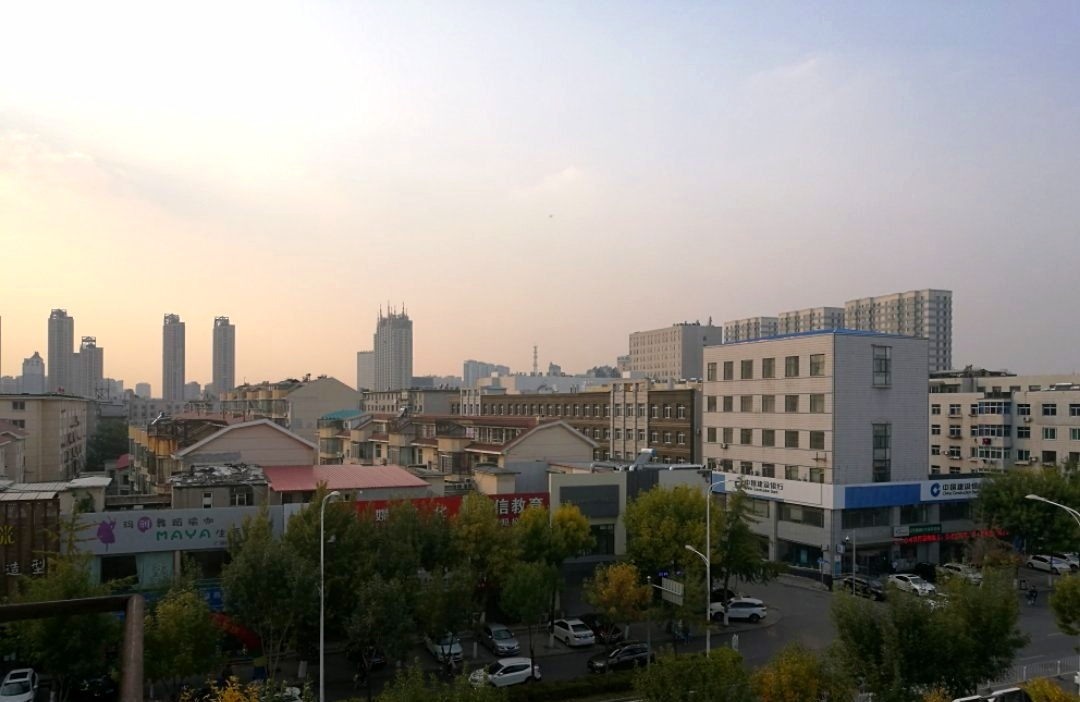
- Skyline of Baita

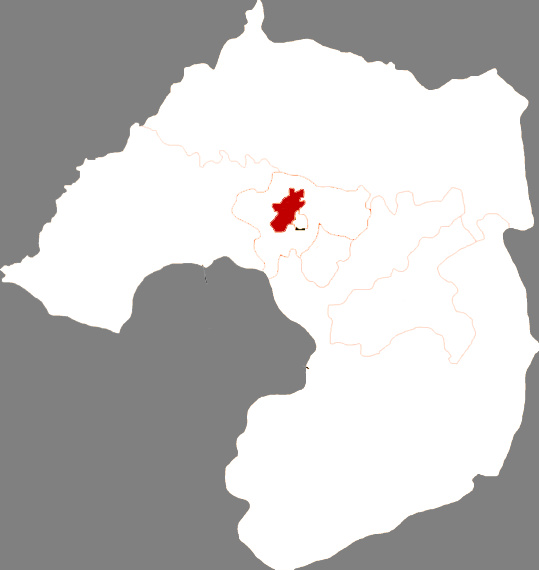
- Location in Liaoyang

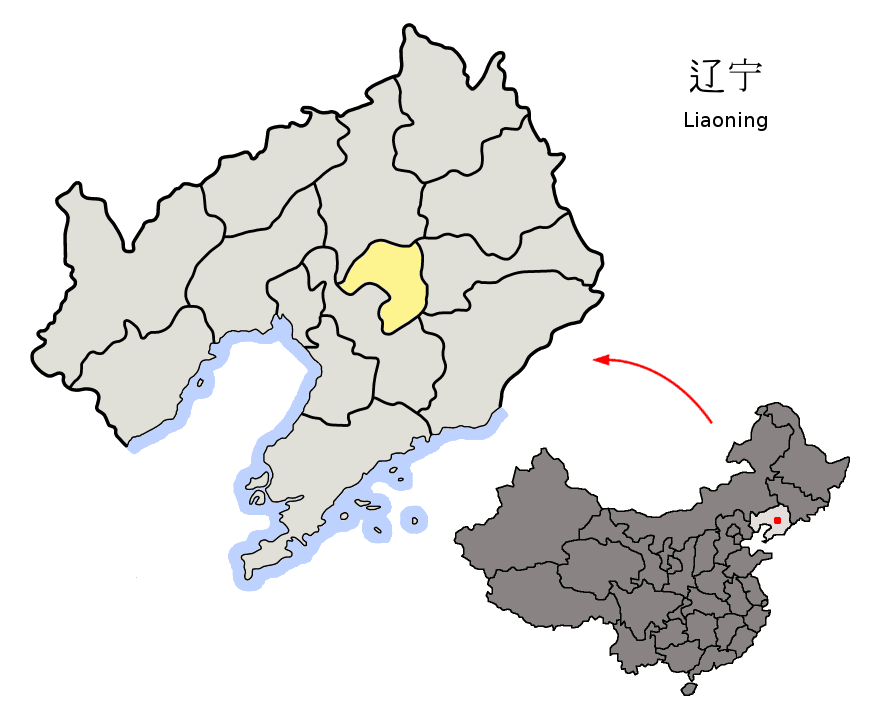
- Liaoyang in Liaoning province
- Coordinates: 41°16′13″N 123°10′27″E
- Country: China
- Province: Liaoning
- Prefecture-level city: Liaoyang
- District seat: Wensheng Subdistrict

Area
  - Total: 29.8 km^{2} (11.5 sq mi)

Population (2020 census)
  - Total: 359,401
  - Density: 12,100/km^{2} (31,200/sq mi)
- Time zone: UTC+8 (China Standard)
- Website: www.lybtq.gov.cn

Baita District (simplified Chinese: 白塔区; traditional Chinese: 白塔區; pinyin: Báitǎ Qū; lit. 'White Tower') is a district of Liaoyang City, Liaoning province, China.

== Administrative divisions ==
There are 4 subdistricts within the district.

Wensheng Subdistrict (文圣街道), Wusheng Subdistrict (武圣街道), Nanmen Subdistrict (南门街道), Xiangping Subdistrict (襄平街道)
