= Liaoning =

Province of China

Liaoning 辽宁
- Province

Name transcription(s)
  - Chinese: 辽宁省 (Liáoníng Shěng)
  - Abbreviation: LN / 辽 (pinyin: Liáo)
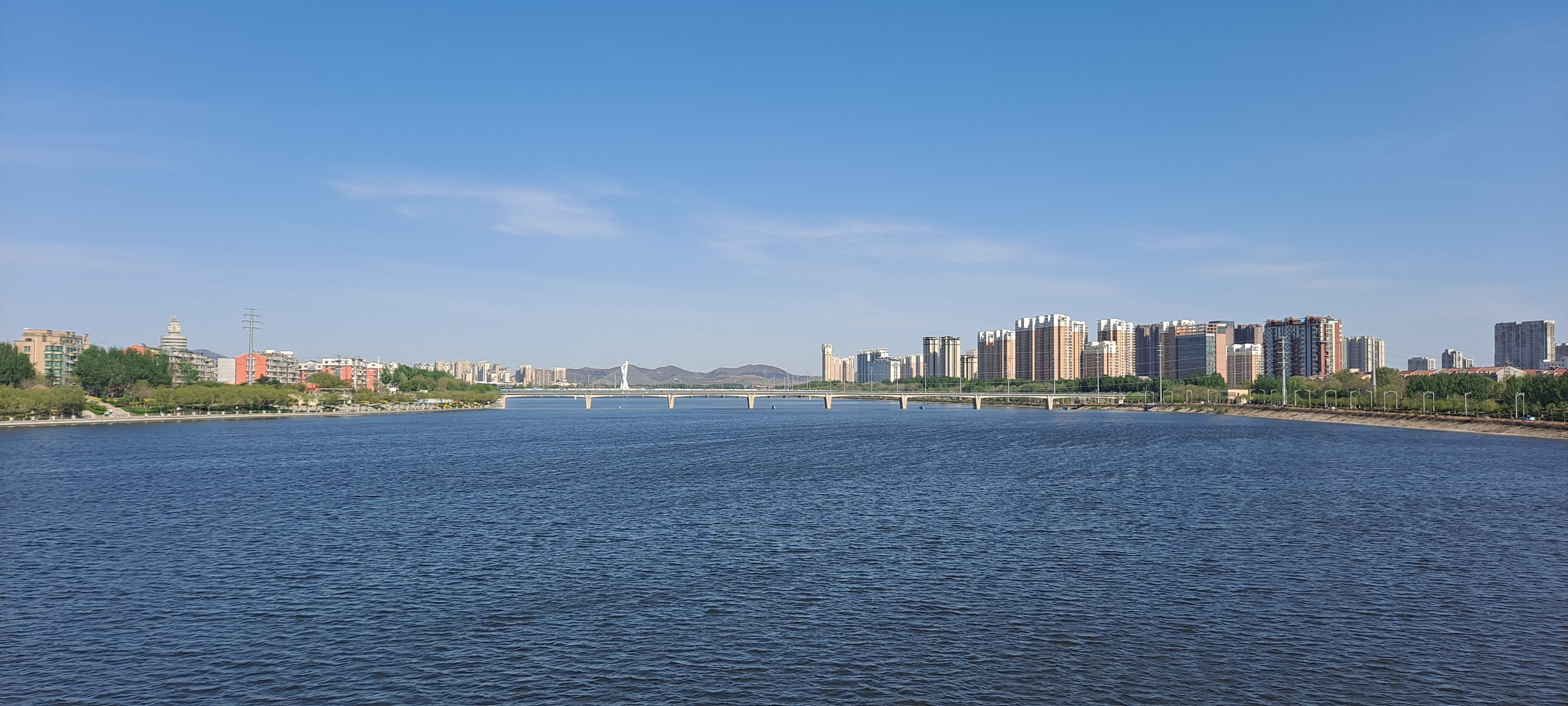
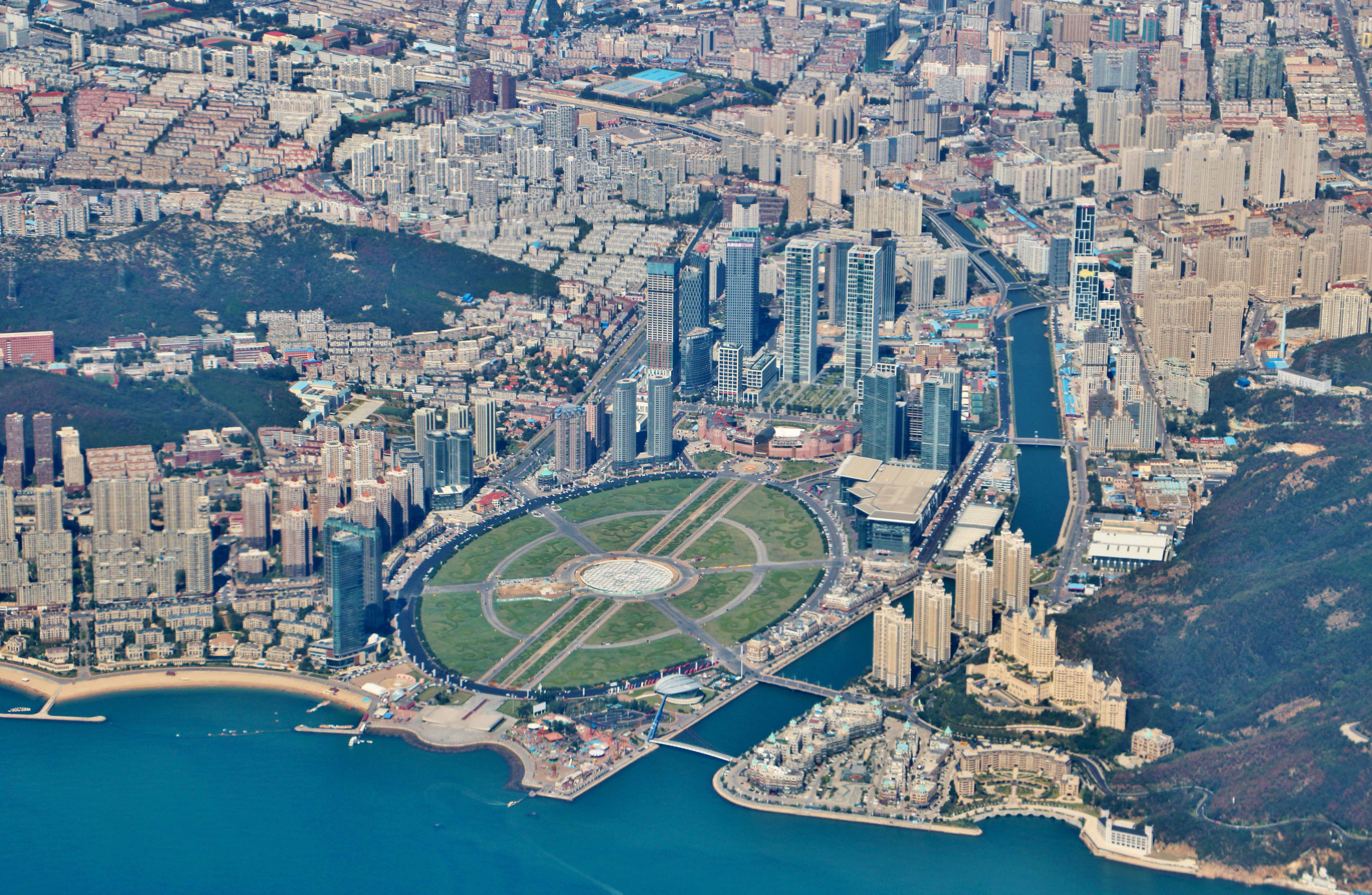
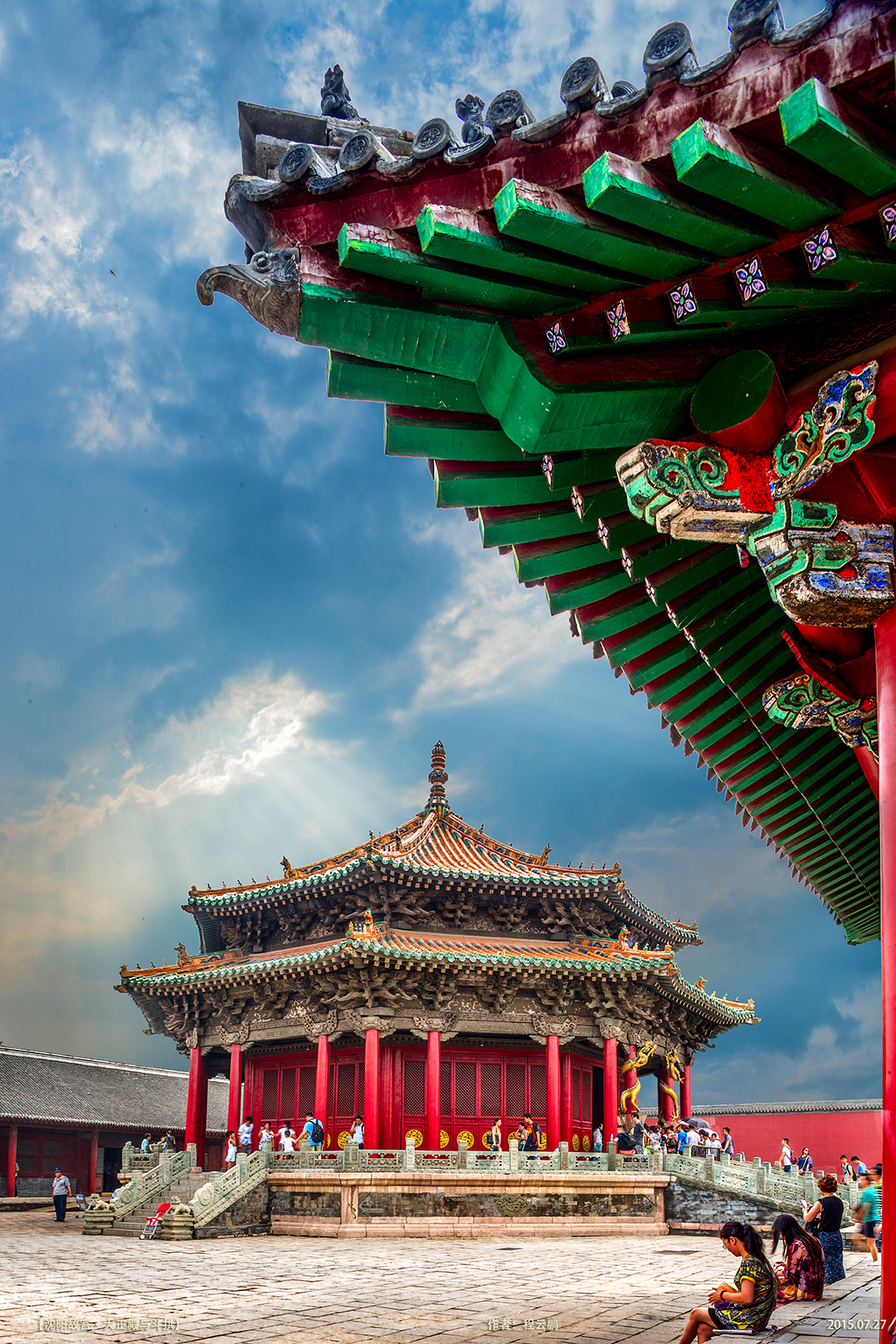
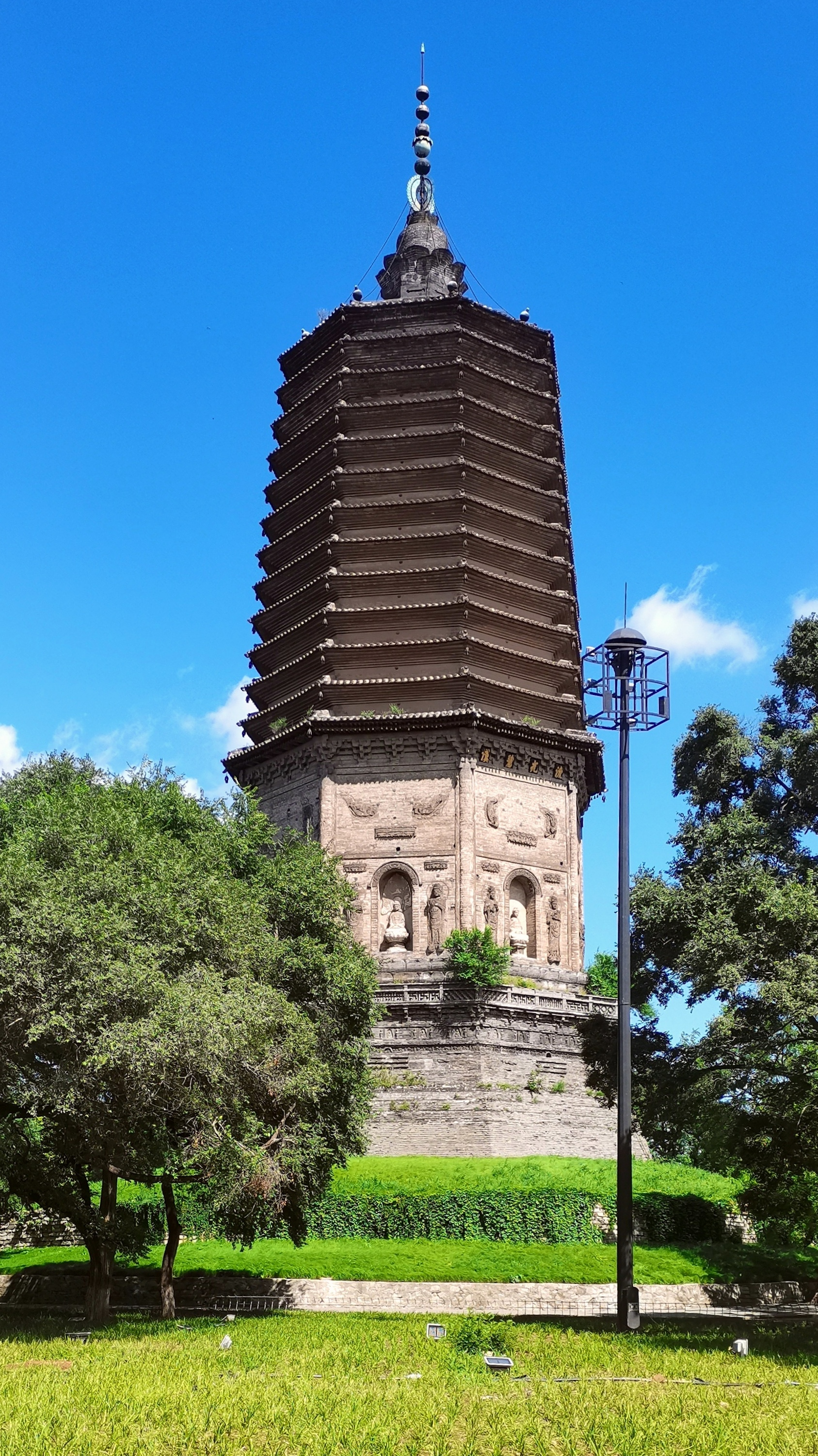
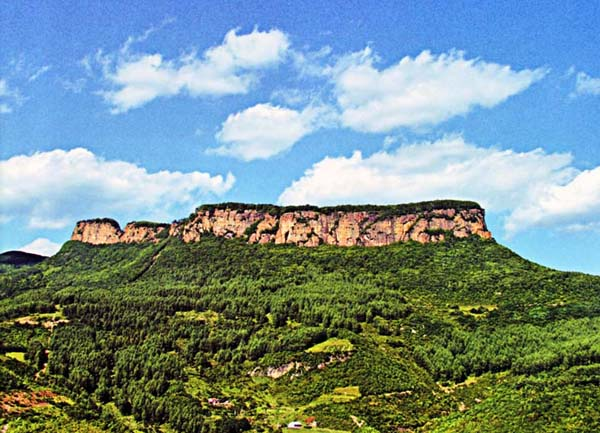
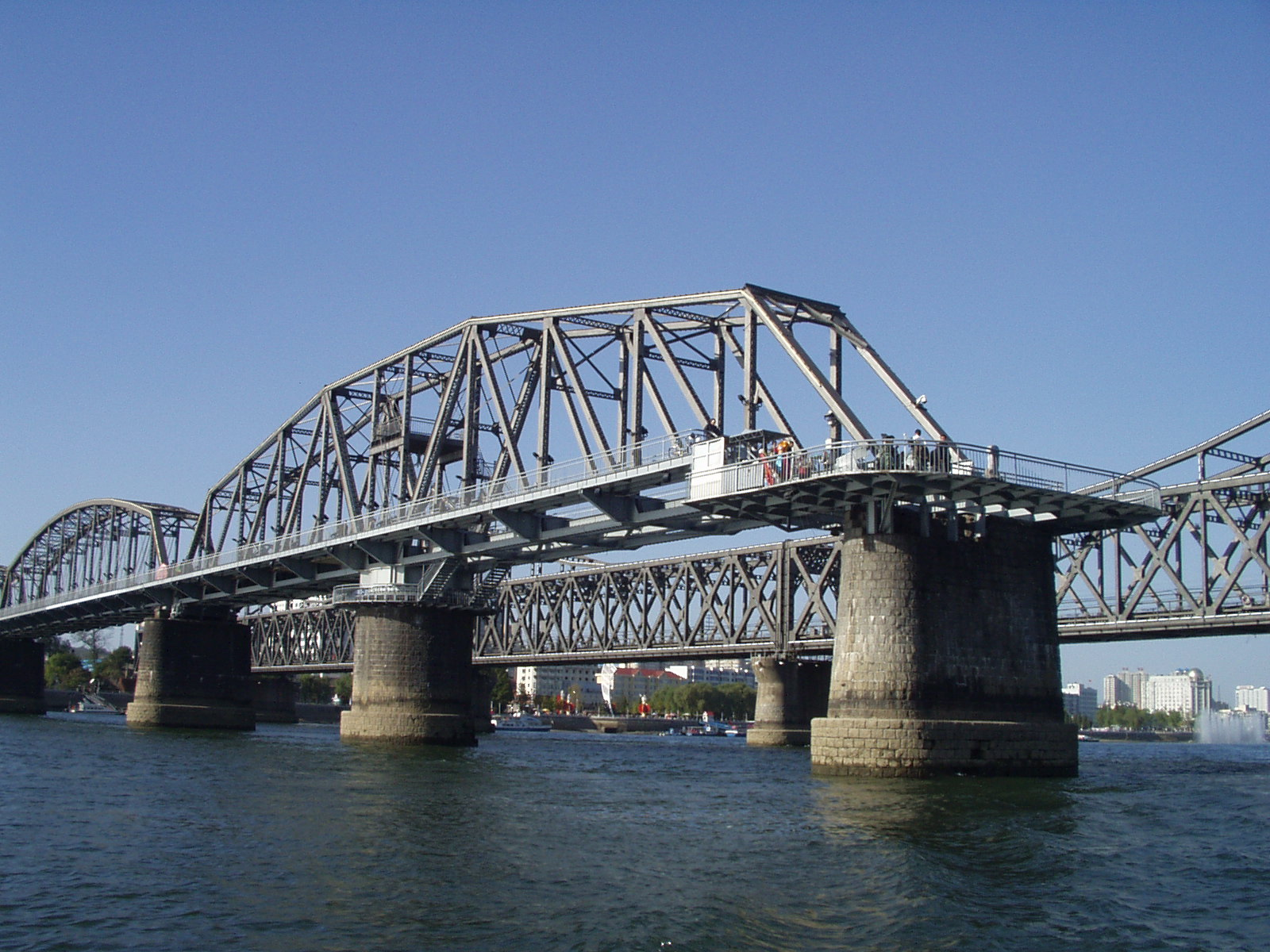
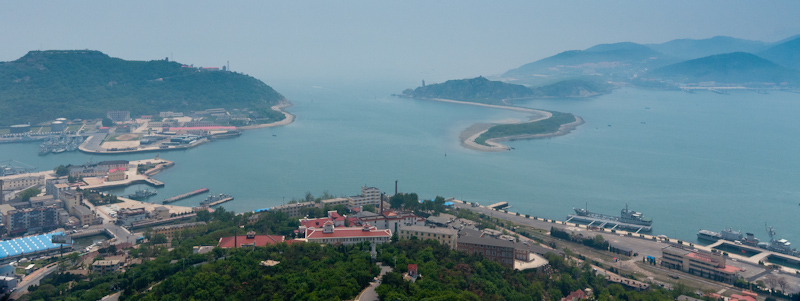
- Jinzhou Xinghai Square Mukden Palace Liaoyang White Pagoda Wunü Mountain Yalu River Broken Bridge Lüshunkou

- Map showing the location of Liaoning Province
- Coordinates: 41°06′N 122°18′E
- Country: China
- Named for: 辽 Liáo—"Liao (River)" 宁 níng—"pacification" "Pacified Liao (River)"
- Capital (and largest city): Shenyang
- Divisions: 14 prefectures, 100 counties, 1511 townships

Government
  - Type: Province
  - Body: Liaoning Provincial People's Congress
  - Party Secretary: Xu Kunlin
  - Congress chairman: Xu Kunlin
  - Governor: Wang Xinwei
  - CPPCC chairman: Zhou Bo
  - National People's Congress Representation: 94 deputies

Area
  - Total: 145,900 km^{2} (56,300 sq mi)
  - Rank: 21st
- Highest elevation (Mount Huabozi): 1,336 m (4,383 ft)

Population (2020)
  - Total: 42,591,407
  - Rank: 14th
  - Density: 291.9/km^{2} (756.1/sq mi)
  - Rank: 15th

Demographics
  - Ethnic composition: Han – 84% Manchu – 13% Mongol – 2% Hui – 0.6% Korean – 0.6% Xibe – 0.3%
  - Languages and dialects: Northeastern Mandarin, Jiaoliao Mandarin, Beijing Mandarin, Pyongan Korean, Manchu

GDP (2023)
  - Total: CN¥ 3,021 billion (16th); US$ 429 billion
  - Per capita: CN¥ 72,107 (19th); US$ 10,233
- ISO 3166 code: CN-LN
- HDI (2023): 0.803 (10th) – very high
- Website: ln.gov.cn

Liaoning
- "Liaoning" in Simplified (top) and Traditional (bottom) Chinese characters

Chinese name
- Simplified Chinese: 辽宁
- Traditional Chinese: 遼寧
- Literal meaning: "Pacified Liao (River)"
Transcriptions
Standard Mandarin
- Hanyu Pinyin: Liáoníng
- Bopomofo: ㄌㄧㄠˊ ㄋㄧㄥˊ
- Gwoyeu Romatzyh: Liauning
- Wade–Giles: Liao^{2}-ning^{2}
- IPA: [ljǎʊ.nǐŋ]
Yue: Cantonese
- Yale Romanization: Lìuh-nìng
- Jyutping: Liu^{4}-ning^{4}
- IPA: [liw˩.nɪŋ˩]
Southern Min
- Hokkien POJ: Liâu-lêng

Manchu name
- Manchu script: ᠯᡳᠶᠣᠣ ᠨᡳᠩ ᡤᠣᠯᠣ
- Romanization: Liyoo'ning golo

Fengtian / Mukden Province

Chinese name
- Chinese: 奉天
Transcriptions
Standard Mandarin
- Hanyu Pinyin: Fèngtiān
- Bopomofo: ㄈㄥˋ ㄊㄧㄢ
- Gwoyeu Romatzyh: Fenqtian
- Wade–Giles: Fêng^{4}-tʻien^{1}

Manchu name
- Manchu script: ᠠᠪᡴᠠᡳ ᡳᠮᡳᠶᠠᠩᡤᠠ ᡤᠣᠯᠣ
- Romanization: Abkai-imiyangga golo

Liaoning (Note: /ljaʊˈnɪŋ/; Chinese: 辽宁) is a coastal province in Northeastern China that is the smallest, southernmost, and most populous province in the region. With its capital at Shenyang, it is located on the northern shore of the Yellow Sea, and is the northernmost coastal province of the People's Republic of China.

Historically a gateway between China proper and Manchuria, the modern Liaoning province was established as Fengtian or Fengtien Province (奉天省) in 1907 and was renamed Liaoning in 1929. It was also known at that time as Mukden Province for the Manchu name of Shengjing, the former name of Shenyang. Under the Japanese-puppet Manchukuo regime, the province reverted to its 1907 name, but the name Liaoning was restored for a brief time in 1945 and then again in 1954.

Liaoning borders the Yellow Sea (Korea Bay) and Bohai Sea in the south, North Korea's North Pyongan and Chagang provinces in the southeast, Jilin to the northeast, Hebei to the southwest, and Inner Mongolia to the northwest. The Yalu River marks the province's border with North Korea, emptying into the Korea Bay between Dandong in Liaoning and Sinuiju in North Korea. Liaoning is also one of China's leading provinces in research and education. As of 2025, two major cities in Liaoning ranked in the world's top 100 cities (Dalian #42 and Shenyang #82) by scientific research output, as tracked by Nature Index.

== Name ==
Liaoning is named after the Liao River that runs through the province. Ning (宁, "peace") is used frequently in Chinese place names including Ningxia, Xining and Nanning. The current name was first adopted in 1929, and restored in 1954 upon the merging of the Liaoxi ("West Liao") and Liaodong ("East Liao") provinces.

== History ==
=== From Yan to Tang ===
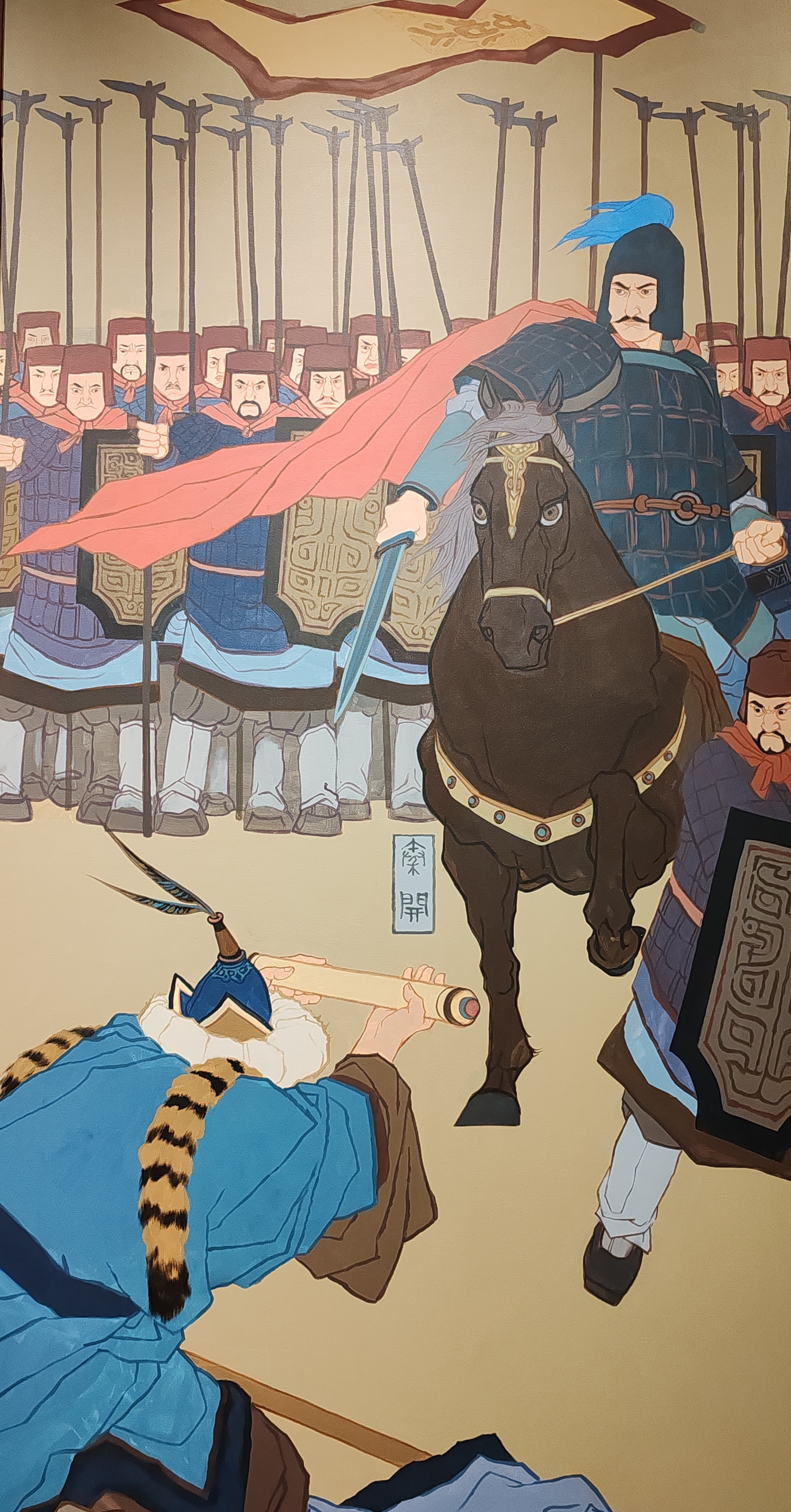
Yan general Qin Kai first led the conquest of Liaoning around 300 BC

From 4th century BC to 9th century, Liaoning was predominantly settled and administered by Han Chinese regime. Prior to 3rd century BC, Donghu, Gojoseon and Yemaek peoples inhabited Liaoning and later, the state of Yan conquered the area around 300 BC. Two commanderies, Liaodong ("east of the Liao River") and Liaoxi ("west of the Liao River"), were established within the Liaoning region. The Yan city of Xiangping, the center of Liaodong, was located on the site of the present Liaoyang city. As the Han dynasty fell, warlord Gongsun Du and his family established and maintained a semi-independent state based in Liaodong, until it was defeated by Cao Wei in 238. The state, also known as Yan, conducted numerous maritime diplomatic and trade expeditions, and had a lasting influence on Northeast Asian culture despite being short-lived. After the end of Western Jin dynasty, Liaoning was ruled by Xianbei states of the Murong tribe – Former Yan, Later Yan, and Northern Yan. In 436, as Northern Wei seized the Yan capital, Liaodong Peninsula was taken over by Goguryeo. The Tang dynasty annexed the region during the Goguryeo–Tang War.

=== Cradle of various nations ===
In the mid 8th century the An Lushan Rebellion broke out, which greatly drained Tang's resources away from its frontiers, and the Bohai gradually expanded into Liaodong. Eventually, Liaoning was conquered by the Khitan Liao dynasty; during the Liao dynasty, the region was divided among the Eastern Capital Circuit (Dongjingdao), the Supreme Capital Circuit (Shangjingdao), the Central Capital Circuit (Zhongjingdao), and the Lower Capital Circuit (Xiajingdao). Under the Jurchen Jin dynasty, most of the area was administered by the Eastern Capital Route (Dongjinglu), while the rest was divided among the Xianping Route, the Supreme Capital Route (Shangjinglu), and the Northern Capital Route (Beijinglu). In 1206, Liaoning was conquered by Genghis Khan, and later was incorporated into the Yuan dynasty, during the eastern part of the region belonged to the Liaoyang Route and Shenyang Route under the Liaoyang Branch Secretariat; the northern area was under the Kaiyuan Route’s Xianping Prefecture; the western area, including Guangning Route, was also subordinate to the Liaoyang Branch Secretariat; while the Jinzhou and Chaoyang regions were part of the Daning Route under the Central Secretariat.

=== Reconquest of Ming ===
The Ming Empire took control of Liaoning in 1371, just three years after the expulsion of the Mongols from Beijing. Around 1442, a defense wall was constructed to defend the agricultural heartland of the province from a potential threat from the Jurchen-Mongol Oriyanghan (who were Ming's tributaries) from the northwest. Between 1467 and 1468, the wall was expanded to protect the region from the northeast as well, against attacks from Jianzhou Jurchens (who were later to become known as the Manchu people). Although similar in purpose to the Great Wall of China, this "Liaodong Wall" was of a lower-cost design. While stones and tiles were used in some parts, most of the wall was in fact simply an earth dike with moats on both sides.

Despite the Liaodong Wall, the Jurchens conquered Liaodong, or eastern Liaoning, in the early 17th century, decades before the rest of China fell to them. The Jurchen dynasty, styled "Later Jin" before being renamed to Qing, established its capital in 1616–1621 in Xingjing (兴京), which was located outside of the Liaodong Wall in the eastern part of the modern Liaoning Province. It was moved to Dongjing (east of today's Liaoyang, Liaoning), and finally in 1625 to Shengjing (now, Shenyang, Liaoning). Although the main Qing capital was moved from Shengjing to Beijing after it fell to the Qing in 1644, Shengjing retained its importance as a regional capital throughout most of the Qing era.

=== Rise of Later Jin (Qing) ===
The Qing conquest of Liaoning resulted in a significant population loss in the area, as many local Chinese residents were either killed during fighting, or fled south of the Great Wall, many cities being destroyed by the retreating Ming forces themselves. As late as 1661, the Civil Governor (Fuyin) of Fengtian Province, Zhang Shangxian reported that, outside of Fengtian City (Shenyang), Liaoyang, and Haicheng, all other cities east of the Liao River were either abandoned, or hardly had a few hundred residents left. In the Governor's words, "Tieling and Fushun only have a few vagrants". West of the Liao, only Ningyuan, Jinzhou, and Guangning had any significant populations remaining.

In the latter half of the seventeenth century (starting with laws issued in 1651 and 1653), the imperial Qing government recruited migrants from south of the Great Wall (notably, from Shandong) to settle the relatively sparsely populated area of Fengtian Province (roughly corresponding to today's Liaoning). Many of the current residents of Liaoning trace their ancestry to these seventeenth century settlers. The rest of China's Northeast, however, remained officially off-limits to Han Chinese for most of the Manchu era. To prevent the migration of Chinese to those regions (today's Jilin and Heilongjiang, as well as the adjacent parts of Inner Mongolia), the so-called Willow Palisade was constructed (c. 1638 – c. 1672). The Palisade encircled the agricultural heartlands of Fengtian, running in most areas either somewhat outside the old Ming Liaodong Wall, or reusing it, and separating it from the Manchu forests to the northeast and the Mongol grazing lands to the northwest.

Later on, the Qing government tried to stop the migrants flow to Fengtian or even to make some settlers return to their original places of residence – or, failing that, to legalize them. For example, an edict issued in 1704 commented on the recent Han Chinese settlers in Fengtian having failed to comply with earlier orders requiring them to leave, and asked them either to properly register and join a local defense group (保; bao), or to leave the province for their original places within the next ten years. Ten years later, naturally, another edict appeared, reminding of the necessity to do something with illegal migrants ... In any event, the restrictive policy was not as effective as desired by the officials in Beijing, and Fengtian's population doubled between 1683 and 1734.

During the Qing dynasty, Manchuria was ruled by three generals, one of whom, the General of Shengjing (Mukden i Jiyanggiyūn) ruled much of modern Liaoning. In 1860, the Manchu government began to reopen the region to migration, which quickly resulted in Han Chinese becoming the dominant ethnic group in the region.

=== Modern era ===
In the 20th century, the province of Fengtian was set up in what is Liaoning today. When Japan and Russia fought the Russo-Japanese War in 1904–1905, many key battles took place in Liaoning, including the Battle of Port Arthur and the Battle of Mukden, which was, to that point, the largest land battle ever fought. During the Warlord Era in the early twentieth century, Liaoning was under the Fengtian clique, including Zhang Zuolin and his son Zhang Xueliang. The province first received its present name on January 29, 1929; the Zhongdong Railway Incident took place later that year. In 1931, Japan invaded and the area came under the rule of the Japanese-controlled puppet state of Manchukuo. The Chinese Civil War that took place following Japanese defeat in 1945 had its first major battles (the Liaoshen Campaign) in and around Liaoning.

At the founding of the People's Republic of China in 1949, Liaoning did not exist; instead there were two provinces, Liaodong and Liaoxi, as well as five municipalities, Shenyang, Lüda (present-day Dalian), Anshan, Fushun, and Benxi. These were all merged into "Liaoning" in 1954, and parts of former Rehe province were merged into Liaoning in 1955. During the Cultural Revolution Liaoning also took in a part of Inner Mongolia, though this was reversed later.

Liaoning was one of the first provinces in China to industrialize, first under Japanese occupation, and then even more in the 1950s and 1960s. The city of Anshan, for example, is home to one of the largest iron and steel complexes in China. In recent years, this early focus on heavy industry has become a liability, as many of the large state-run enterprises have experienced economic difficulties. Recognizing the special difficulties faced by Liaoning and other provinces in Northeast China because of their heritage of heavy industry, the Chinese central government recently launched a "Revitalize the Northeast" Campaign.

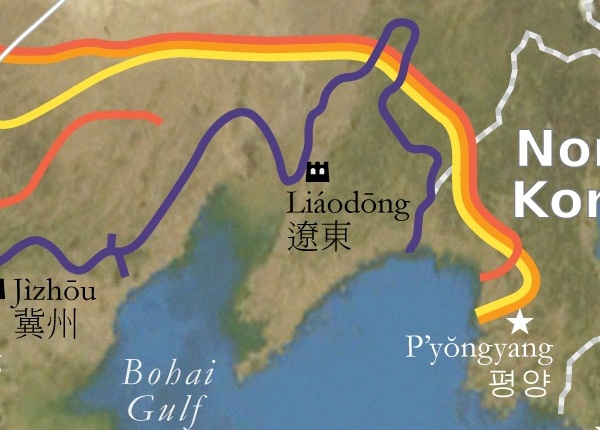
The Ming Liaodong Greatwall (in purple)

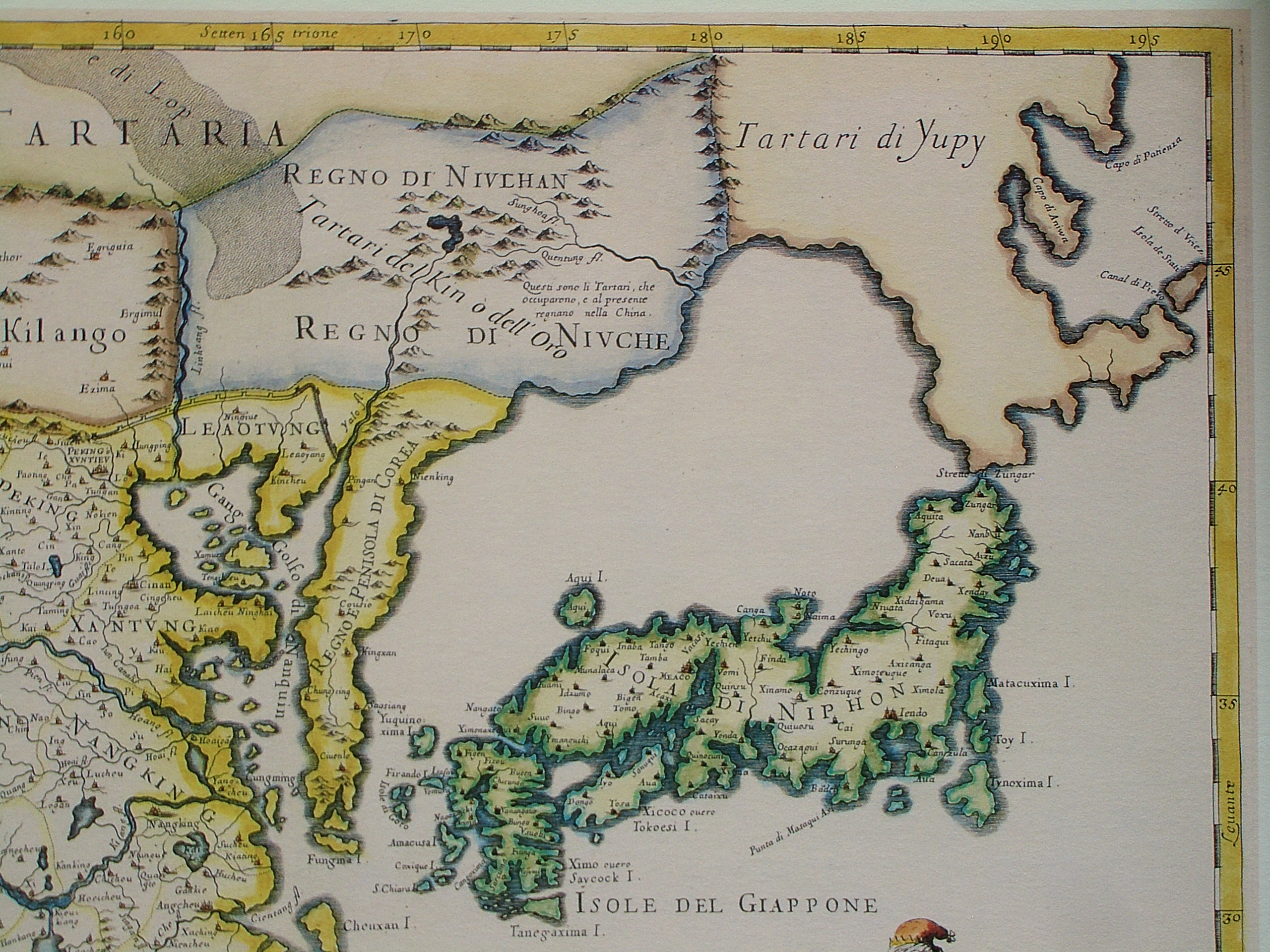
The late-Ming Liaodong (eastern Liaoning) separated by the wall from the "Kingdom of the Jurchen" (Regno di Niuche). The map was created during the early Qing, and mentions that "presently" the Jurchen (Tartari del Kin) have already conquered the rest of China

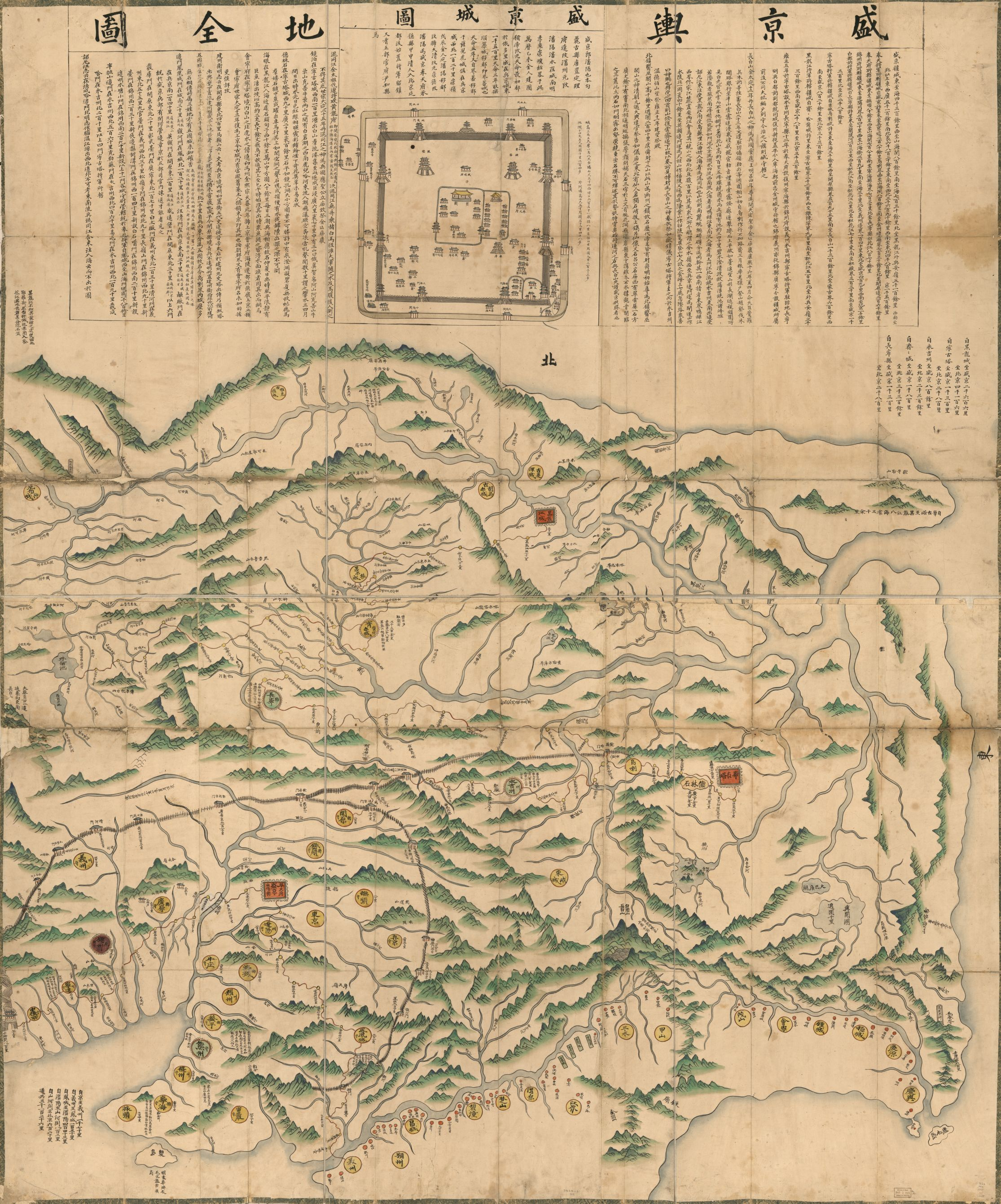
The full picture of Shengjing area 1734

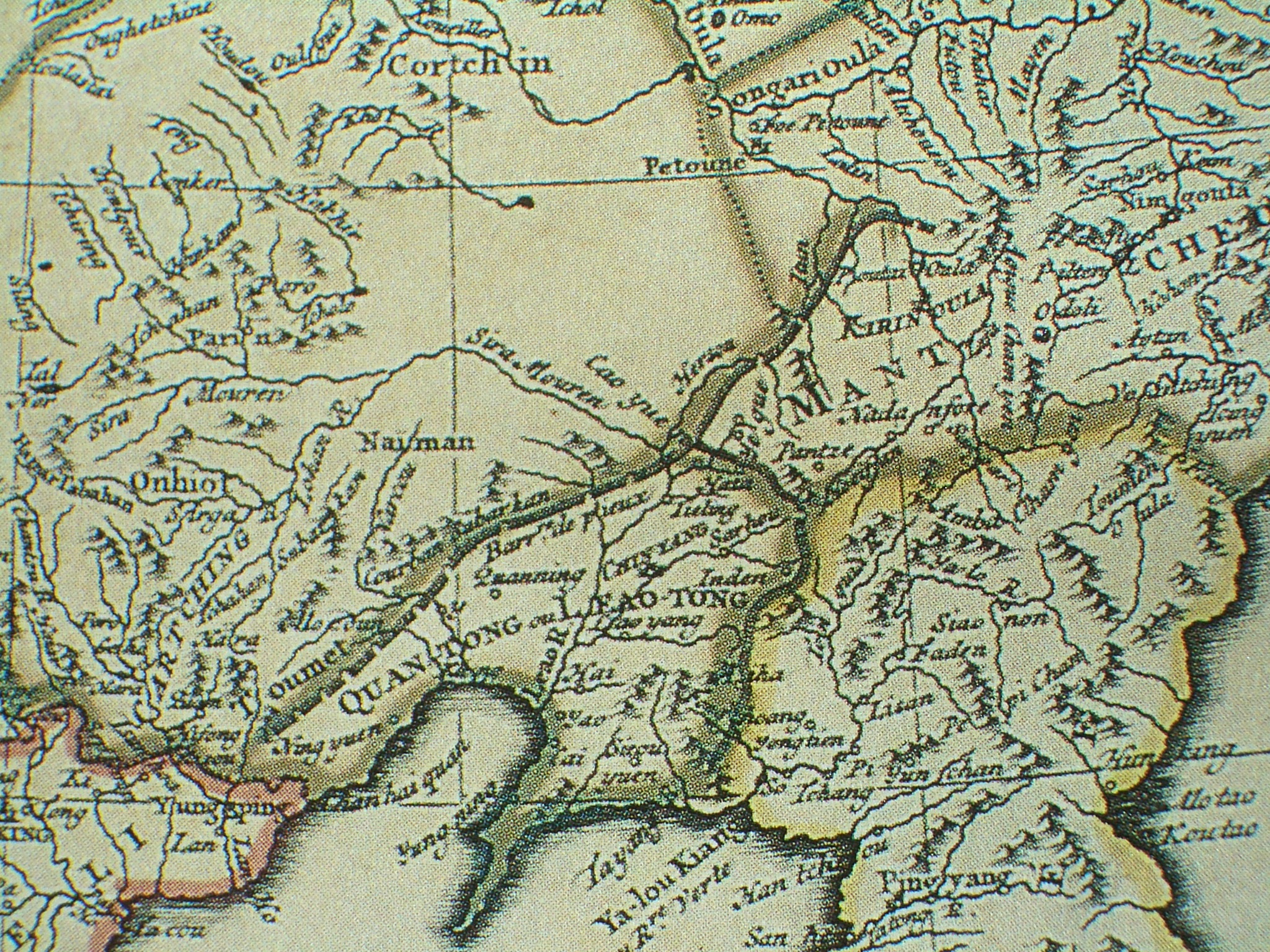
Liaodong (Leao-Tong) in the early Qing, surrounded by the Willow Palisade. This map, published in 1734, was based on data collected by Jesuits in the early 18th century. The capital is in Shenyang (Chinyang); most other cities mentioned in Governor Zhang's report are shown as well

== Geography ==
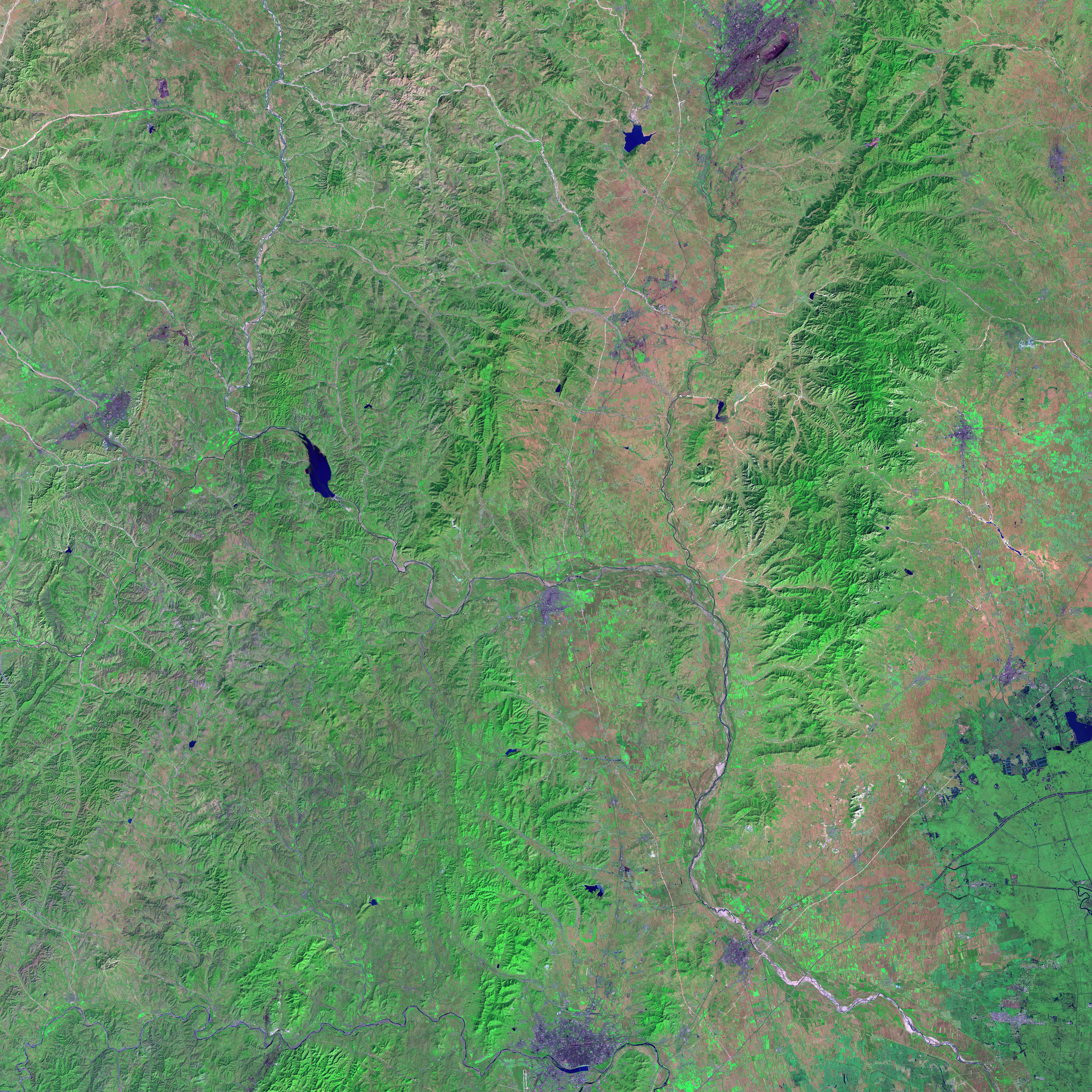
Landsat 7 image of western Liaoning

It is possible to think of Liaoning as three approximate geographical regions: the highlands in the west, plains in the middle, and hills in the east.

The highlands in the west are dominated by the Nulu'erhu Mountains, which roughly follow the border between Liaoning and Inner Mongolia. The entire region is dominated by low hills. A narrow strip of coastal plains, known as the Liaoxi Corridor, connects the Liao River Basin to the North China Plain, ending at the Shanhai Pass of the Great Wall.

The central part of Liaoning consists of a basin drained by rivers such as the Liao, Daliao, and their tributaries. This region is mostly flat and low-lying.

The eastern part of Liaoning is dominated by the Changbai Mountains and Qianshan Mountains which extend into the sea to form the Liaodong Peninsula. The highest point in Liaoning, Mount Huabozi (1336 m), is found in this region.

Liaoning has a continental monsoon climate, and rainfall averages to about 440 to 1130 mm annually. Summer is rainy while the other seasons are dry.

Major cities:

- Shenyang
- Dalian
- Anshan
- Liaoyang
- Fushun
- Dandong
- Jinzhou
- Yingkou

== Paleontology ==
Liaoning contains some of the foremost paleontological sites in the world. Known collectively as the Jehol Group, they include the Yixian Formation, Jiufotang Formation and Tiaojishan Formation. The name Jehol derives from a now defunct provincial division of that name, which covered an area that is now Western Liaoning, Eastern Hebei, and a small part of Inner Mongolia. Fossils were first found there during the 1920s. During the Japanese occupation of the area through the 1930s and early 1940s, more fossils were found, but records of them were lost after World War II ended. The area remained relatively unexplored until the 1990s. It was in 1996 that Liaoning made the headlines with the announcement of the discovery of Sinosauropteryx prima, the first example of a filamented "feathered" dinosaur. Sinosauropteryx prima was a small feathered meat-eating dinosaur, from the Lower Cretaceous Yixian Formation. This discovery pushed the evolution of feathers back in time and showed that dinosaurs, not only birds, had feathers. It also showed a direct evolutionary link between theropod dinosaurs and modern birds.

Since then, dozens of ground-breaking finds have been discovered throughout the Jehol group. These including the earliest flower, earliest eutherian mammal, known as Eomaia, the earliest known metatherian, an intact embryo of a pterosaur, Repenomamus robustus—a 15 kg heavy mammal that ate dinosaurs, Sinornithosaurus millenii, as well as many birds and feathered dinosaurs. Discoveries such as Dilong paradoxus, another feathered theropod, date to the early Cretaceous Period. This is some 60 million years before Tyrannosaurus, and thus these discoveries push the evolution of feathers earlier than previously thought.

The Liaoning fossils are noted for their high degree of preservation—often including soft body tissues, which is rare. Aside from the famous birds and feathered dinosaurs, the Liaoning fossils include insects, fish, aquatic arthropods, and plants. The Liaoning deposit is widely considered to be one of the world's premier fossil sites. The high level of preservation is believed to be due to how the animals died. The area was volcanically active, and large plumes of volcanic dust repeatedly covered the area, instantly killing and burying any living thing in the area. The extremely fine grain of the sediment and the chemical composition of the ash prevented the usual bacterial decay. In some specimens, extremely fine details can be seen such as the proboscis of the bee Florinemestruis used to drink nectar from the earliest flowers. In other specimens, colours are still visible, including stripes on fish and spots on turtles.

== Politics ==
The politics of Liaoning is structured in a single party-government system like all other governing institutions in mainland China. The Governor of Liaoning is the highest-ranking official in the People's Government of Liaoning. However, in the province's single party-government governing system, the Governor has less power than the Chinese Communist Party Liaoning Provincial Committee Secretary.

Prior to 1949 and the Chinese Communist Revolution, Liaoning was governed by the Fengtian clique of warlords and interchangeably officials of the Chiang Kai-shek bureaucracy. During the Qing dynasty Liaoning was known as the province of Fengtian (奉天), and was governed by a zǒngdū or Viceroy (The Viceroy of the Three Eastern Provinces, 东三省总督), along with the provinces of Jilin and Heilongjiang. The province itself also had a governor (巡抚; xúnfǔ).

== Administrative divisions ==
Liaoning is divided into fourteen prefecture-level divisions, all prefecture-level cities (including two sub-provincial cities):

Administrative divisions of Liaoning
Division code	Division	Area in km^{2}	Population 2010	Seat	Divisions			
Division code	Division	Area in km^{2}	Population 2010	Seat	Districts	Counties	Aut. counties	CL cities
210000	Liaoning Province	145,900.00	43,746,323	Shenyang city	59	17	8	16
210100	Shenyang city	12,860.00	8,106,171	Hunnan District	10	2		1
210200	Dalian city	12,573.85	6,690,432	Xigang District	7	1		2
210300	Anshan city	9,252.00	3,645,884	Tiedong District	4	1	1	1
210400	Fushun city	11,272.00	2,138,090	Shuncheng District	4	1	2	
210500	Benxi city	8,420.00	1,709,538	Pingshan District	4		2	
210600	Dandong city	15,289.61	2,444,697	Zhenxing District	3		1	2
210700	Jinzhou city	9,890.62	3,126,463	Taihe District	3	2		2
210800	Yingkou city	5,365.46	2,428,534	Zhanqian District	4			2
210900	Fuxin city	10,354.99	1,819,339	Xihe District	5	1	1	
211000	Liaoyang city	4,743.24	1,858,768	Baita District	5	1		1
211100	Panjin city	4,071.10	1,392,493	Xinglongtai District	3	1		
211200	Tieling city	12,979.69	2,717,732	Yinzhou District	2	3		2
211300	Chaoyang city	19,698.00	3,044,641	Shuangta District	2	2	1	2
211400	Huludao city	10,414.94	2,623,541	Longgang District	3	2		1
Sub-provincial cities

Administrative divisions in Chinese and varieties of romanizations
English	Chinese	Pinyin
Liaoning Province	辽宁省	Liáoníng Shěng
Shenyang city	沈阳市	Shěnyáng Shì
Dalian city	大连市	Dàlián Shì
Anshan city	鞍山市	Ānshān Shì
Fushun city	抚顺市	Fǔshùn Shì
Benxi city	本溪市	Běnxī Shì
Dandong city	丹东市	Dāndōng Shì
Jinzhou city	锦州市	Jǐnzhōu Shì
Yingkou city	营口市	Yíngkǒu Shì
Fuxin city	阜新市	Fùxīn Shì
Liaoyang city	辽阳市	Liáoyáng Shì
Panjin city	盘锦市	Pánjǐn Shì
Tieling city	铁岭市	Tiělǐng Shì
Chaoyang city	朝阳市	Cháoyáng Shì
Huludao city	葫芦岛市	Húludǎo Shì

These prefecture-level cities are in turn divided into 100 county-level divisions (56 districts, 17 county-level cities, 19 counties, and 8 autonomous counties), which are then further subdivided into 1511 township-level divisions (613 towns, 301 townships, 77 ethnic townships, and 520 subdistricts). At the end of the year 2017, the total population is 43.69 million.

Population by urban areas of prefecture & county cities
#	Cities	2020 Urban area	2010 Urban area	2020 City proper
1	Shenyang	7,229,320	5,718,232 (Note: New district established after 2010 census: Liaozhong (Liaozhong County). The new district not included in the urban area count of the pre-expanded city.)	9,070,093
2	Dalian	5,286,743	3,902,467 (Note: New district established after 2010 census: Pulandian (Pulandian CLC). The new district not included in the urban area count of the pre-expanded city.)	7,450,785
3	Anshan	1,480,332	1,504,996	3,325,372
4	Fushun	1,228,890	1,318,808	1,861,372
5	Yingkou	1,027,117	880,412	2,328,582
6	Jinzhou	1,021,478	946,098	2,703,853
7	Panjin	980,422	663,445 (Note: New district established after 2010 census: Dawa (Dawa County). The new district not included in the urban area count of the pre-expanded city.)	1,389,691
8	Benxi	808,221	1,000,128	1,326,018
9	Liaoyang	764,504	735,047	1,604,580
10	Huludao	764,241	646,482	2,434,194
11	Dandong	748,983	775,787	2,188,436
12	Fuxin	742,318	750,283	1,647,280
13	Haicheng	680,033	687,223	see Anshan
14	Chaoyang	580,995	477,610	2,872,857
15	Wafangdian	454,388	413,921	see Dalian
16	Tieling	424,200	396,505	2,388,294
17	Donggang	357,229	290,957	see Dandong
18	Zhuanghe	348,028	304,233	see Dalian
19	Dashiqiao	309,066	330,328	see Yingkou
20	Kaiyuan	257,822	242,412	see Tieling
21	Fengcheng	252,921	247,219	see Dandong
22	Lingyuan	247,488	200,354	see Chaoyang
23	Gaizhou	228,059	218,478	see Yingkou
24	Xingcheng	219,545	178,291	see Huludao
25	Xinmin	218,041	484,287	see Shenyang
26	Beipiao	190,315	168,620	see Chaoyang
27	Dengta	185,623	163,064	see Liaoyang
28	Diaobingshan	179,480	195,673	see Tieling
29	Linghai	167,909	134,716	see Jinzhou
30	Beizhen	152,033	127,101	see Jinzhou
—	Pulandian	see Dalian	319,942	see Dalian

== Economy ==
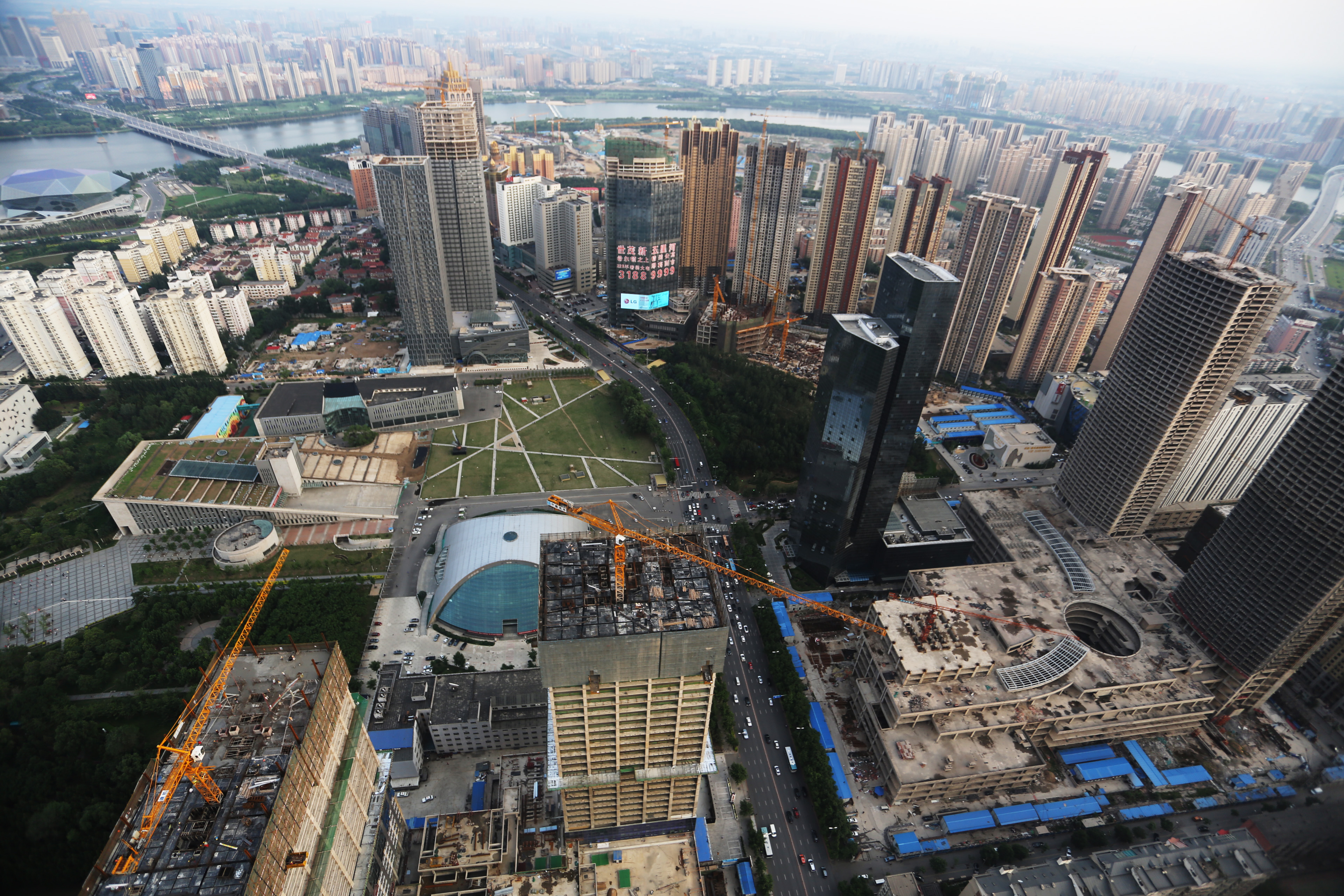
Shenyang, the capital of Liaoning Province

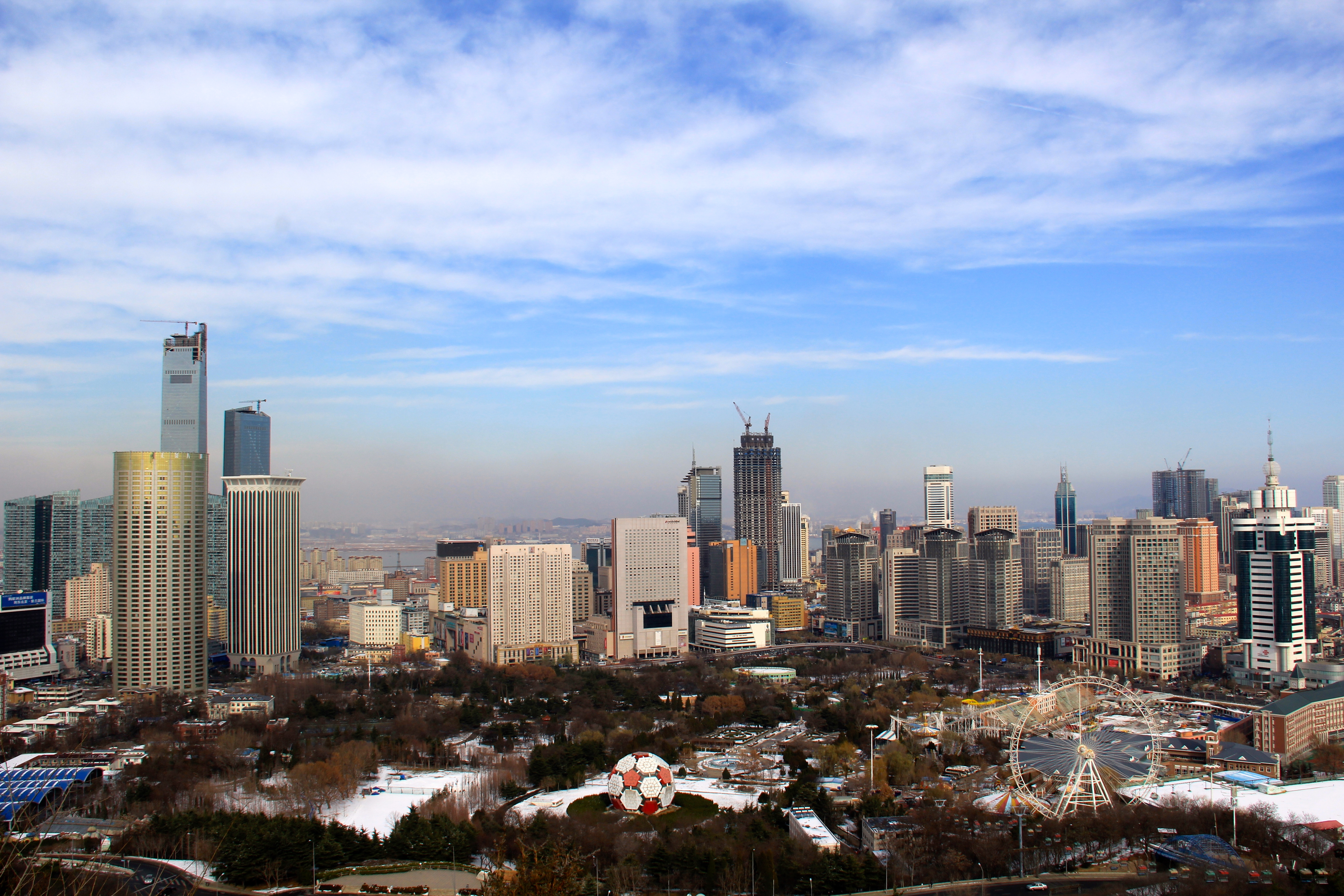
Dalian, second largest city in Liaoning Province

Liaoning has the largest and wealthiest provincial economy of Northeast China. Its nominal GDP for 2017 was 2.39 trillion yuan (ca. US$354 billion), making it the 14th largest in China (out of 31 provinces). Its per capita GDP was 54,745 yuan (US$8,108). Among the three provinces of Northeast China, Liaoning is the largest in terms of GDP and GDP per capita.

In 2008, Liaoning was the region with the highest GDP growth among global G8x8, the eight provinces or states below national level with the highest GDP of the top eight GDP nations. According to preliminary statistics, Liaoning maintained its GDP growth rate of 13.1 percent in 2009 and held its position as the province with the highest economic growth. Economic growth has since slowed down, with the economy expanding 3% in 2015 and contracting 1.3% in the first quarter of 2016.

Leading industries include petrochemicals, metallurgy, electronics telecommunications, and machinery. On a national level, Liaoning is a major producer of pig iron, steel and metal-cutting machine tools, all of whose production rank among the top three in the nation. Liaoning is one of the most important raw materials production bases in China. Industries such as mining, quarrying, smelting and pressing of ferrous metals, petroleum and natural gas extraction, are all of great significance.

Meanwhile, Liaoning is an important production base of equipment and machinery manufacturing, with Shenyang and Dalian being the industrial centers. Enterprises such as Shenyang Jinbei Co. Ltd., Daxian Group Co. Ltd., and Shenyang Machine Tool Co. Ltd., are leaders in their sectors. The province's light industry mainly focuses on textiles and clothing industries which include cotton and wool spinning, chemical fiber production, knitting, silk production, and the manufacturing of both garments and textile machinery.

In 2008, its tertiary industry accounted for 34.5 percent of total GDP. In the future, Liaoning will continue its efforts to restructure large and medium-sized state enterprises. Meanwhile, the province will concentrate in developing its four pillar industries – petrochemicals, metallurgy, machinery and electronics.

Liaoning is the place of origin of the Li Keqiang index, an alternative measure of economic performance where GDP figures are unreliable.

=== Agriculture ===
Main agricultural products of Liaoning include maize, sorghum, and soybeans. The region around Dalian produces three-quarters of China's exported apples and peaches. Cotton is also produced.

Liaoning's fruits include apples from Dalian and Yingkou, golden peaches from Dalian, pears from Beizhen of Jinzhou, white pears from Huludao and Suizhong, and apricots and plums from Gushan of Dandong.

=== Mining ===
Liaoning has the most iron, magnesite, diamond, and boron deposits among all province-level subdivisions of China. Liaoning is also an important source of petroleum and natural gas. Salt is produced along the coast.

=== Oil ===
Along with Liaoning's rich mineral reserves, the province also has abundant deposits of crude oil, especially in the Liaohe Oilfield.

=== Industry ===
Liaoning is one of China's most important industrial bases, covering a wide range of industries, including shipbuilding, machinery, electronics, metal refining, petroleum, chemical industries, construction materials and coal.

The marine waters off Liaoning Province produce a wide range of seafood, including abalone, sea cucumber, scallops, prawns, crabs, and sea urchins from Dalian. Additionally, fish from Dandong, jellyfish from Yingkou, and clams from Panjin supply both domestic and regional export markets, though their international reputation varies depending on the specific product.

=== Trade ===
The cities of Dalian, Dandong and Yingkou have been developed as major ports and economic gateways to all of northeast China.

=== Economic and technological development zones ===
Of the development zones formally recognized by the PRC State Council, 56 are located in Liaoning, including 14 on the national level and 42 on the provincial level. These zones are further grouped into Economic Development Zones, High-Tech Zones, Free Trade and Export Processing Zones, and Special Development Zones.

- Shenyang Cross-Strait Science Industrial Zone

In October 1995, the Shenyang Cross-Strait Science Industrial Zone was approved to be established by State Council. The Shenyang Cross-Strait Science Industrial Zone is the only zone established as part of the Shenyang Hunnan Hi-Tech Industrial Development Zone. It has a total area of 5 km^{2} (1.9 sq mi). It welcomes international investment. It focuses on the development of instruments manufacturing, telecommunication, bio-pharmaceuticals, electronics, and new materials.

- Liaoning Shenyang Export Processing Zone

The Liaoning Shenyang Zhangshi Export Processing Zone was approved to be established by the state government in June 2005. It is located in the national-level Shenyang Economic & Technological Development Zone, with a planned area of 62 km^{2} (24 sq mi) and current area of 14.1 km^{2} (5.4 sq mi). It encourages and focuses on the development of auto and auto parts, electronics, precision machinery, new energy, new materials, and the fine chemical industry.

- Shenyang Economic and Technological Development Zone
- Shenyang Hunnan Hi-Tech Industrial Development Zone

The Shenyang Hunnan Hi-Tech Industrial Development Zone used to be called the Shenyang Hi-Tech Industrial Development Zone. Established in 1988, it is a national high-tech development zone approved by the State Council. The zone is located in western Shenyang City with an area of 32 square kilometres (12 sq mi). Its encouraged industries include electronic information, new materials, biological engineering, energy saving, and environmental protection.

- Anshan Hi-Tech Industrial Development Zone
- Dalian Economic & Technological Development Zone

The Dalian Economic & Technological Development Zone (now known as the "Dalian Development Area") was established in September 1984, as one of the first of the China National Economic and Technological Development Zones. The zone had a GDP of 70.31 billion yuan in 2007 and the total volume of its import and export trade was 14.92 billion dollars, which accounts for a quarter of such trade for all of Liaoning Province. Most of the enterprises in Dalian ETDZ are factories owned by foreign enterprises, especially from Japan, South Korea and the United States, such as Canon, Pfizer, Toshiba, and Intel.

- Dalian Export Processing Zone

The Dalian Export Processing Zone was approved to be set up by the State Council in April 2000, with a planned area of 2.95 km^{2} (1.14 sq mi). It is divided into two parts, A Zone and B Zone. A Zone has a construction area of 1.5 km^{2} (0.58 sq mi), and started operation in May 2001. All the basic infrastructure is available, which includes road, water, gas, and power supply, telecommunication, and so on. A Zone promotes industries such as home appliances, lighting, machinery, construction materials, and medical instruments.

- Dalian Free Trade Zone

The Dalian Free Trade Zone was approved to be set up by the government in May, 1992. Policies include duty-free trade. It has attracted some leading industries, such as electronics, machinery, and plastics.

- Dalian Hi-Tech Industrial Development Zone

The Dalian Hi-Tech Industrial Development Zone was approved to be a national-level development zone in 1991. It has a total area of 35.6 square kilometres (13.7 sq mi). It focuses on and encourages the following industries: electronic information, bio-pharmaceuticals, and new materials.

- Dandong Border Economic Corporation Zone

The Dandong Border Economic Corporation Zone was approved to be a national-level development zone in 1992. It is located in the bank of Yalu River, and opposite Sinuiju, a North Korean city. It promotes industries such as electronic information, machinery manufacturing, and bio-pharmaceuticals.

- Yingkou Economic & Technical Development Zone

=== Regional development strategies ===
==== Central Liaoning City Cluster (Shenyang Metro Area) ====
The Central Liaoning city cluster is a megalopolis centered on Shenyang (urban population 4 million). Within its 150 km (93 mi) radius, it includes Anshan (urban population 1.3 million), Fushun (1.3 million), Yingkou (1.1 million), Benxi (0.95 million), Liaoyang (0.7 million), and Tieling (0.4 million).

In April 2010, the State Council of the People's Republic of China approved a national development strategy for the Shenyang Metro Area. The core of this strategy is innovation in industrial development, integration of the eight cities, integration of urban and rural areas as well as the promotion of more market-oriented development.

==== Liaoning Coastal Economic Belt ====
The Chinese Communist Party Committee Secretary of Liaoning, Li Keqiang, initiated the development of a strategy entitled "5 Points and One Line", which he first proposed on a visit to Yingkou in late 2005. Liaoning Province formally launched the development strategy for the entire Liaoning coastline in early 2006, so as to re-invigorate the provincial economy from its traditional status as a "rustbelt" of Chinese state-owned enterprises.

The "Five Points" indicate five key development areas in the province and cover seven zones: the Changxing Island Harbor Industrial Zone in Dalian; Yingkou Coastal Industrial Base; Liaoxi Jinzhou Bay Coastal Economic Zone; Dandong, and the Zhuanghe Huayuankou Industrial Zone.

The five zones together cover a planned area of nearly 500 square kilometres (190 sq mi).

The "One Line" mentioned in the strategy represents a new series of motorways along the coast. The 1,433-kilometer coastline will become the connection between the five above zones, through which 6 provincial cities, 21 counties and 113 towns will be interlinked. Coastal motorways directly connect the entire string of five zones along the Bohai sea.

== Demographics ==
Historical population
Year	Pop.	±%
1912	12,133,000	—
1928	15,233,000	+25.6%
1936–37	15,254,000	+0.1%
1947	10,007,000	−34.4%
1954	18,545,147	+85.3%
1964	26,946,200	+45.3%
1982	35,721,693	+32.6%
1990	39,459,697	+10.5%
2000	41,824,412	+6.0%
2010	43,746,323	+4.6%
2020	42,591,407	−2.6%
Liaoning Province was known as Fengtian Province until 1929. Shenyang: part of Liaoning Province until 1947; dissolved in 1954 and incorporated into Liaoning Province. Dalian (Lüda): part of Liaoning Province until 1947; dissolved in 1954 and incorporated into Liaoning Province. Andong Province (Liaodong Province): split from Liaoning Province in 1947; dissolved in 1954 and incorporated into Liaoning Province. Liaobei Province: split from Liaoning Province in 1947; dissolved in 1949 and parts were incorporated into Liaoning Province. Rehe Province: incorporated into a province in 1928; dissolved in 1955 and parts were incorporated into Liaoning Province. Liaoxi Province: split from Liaoning Province in 1949; dissolved in 1954 and incorporated into Liaoning Province.

The population of Liaoning is mostly Han Chinese with minorities of Manchus, Mongols, Hui, Koreans and Xibe. Liaoning has both the highest absolute number and highest percentage of Manchus in all of China.

Ethnic groups in Liaoning, 2000 census
Nationality	Population	Percentage
Han Chinese	35,105,991	83.94%
Manchu	5,385,287	12.88%
Mongol	669,972	1.60%
Hui	264,407	0.632%
Koreans	241,052	0.576%
Xibe	132,615	0.317%
Excludes members of the People's Liberation Army in active service. Source:

== Religion ==
Religion in Liaoning (2012)
1. Non religious and traditional faiths (91.3%)
2. Buddhism (5.50%)
3. Protestantism (2.20%)
4. Islam (0.60%)
5. Catholicism (0.20%)
6. Others (0.10%)

According to a 2012 survey, only around 10% of the population of Liaoning belongs to organised religions, the largest groups being Buddhists with 5.5%, followed by Protestants with 2.2%, Muslims with 0.6% and Catholics with 0.2%.

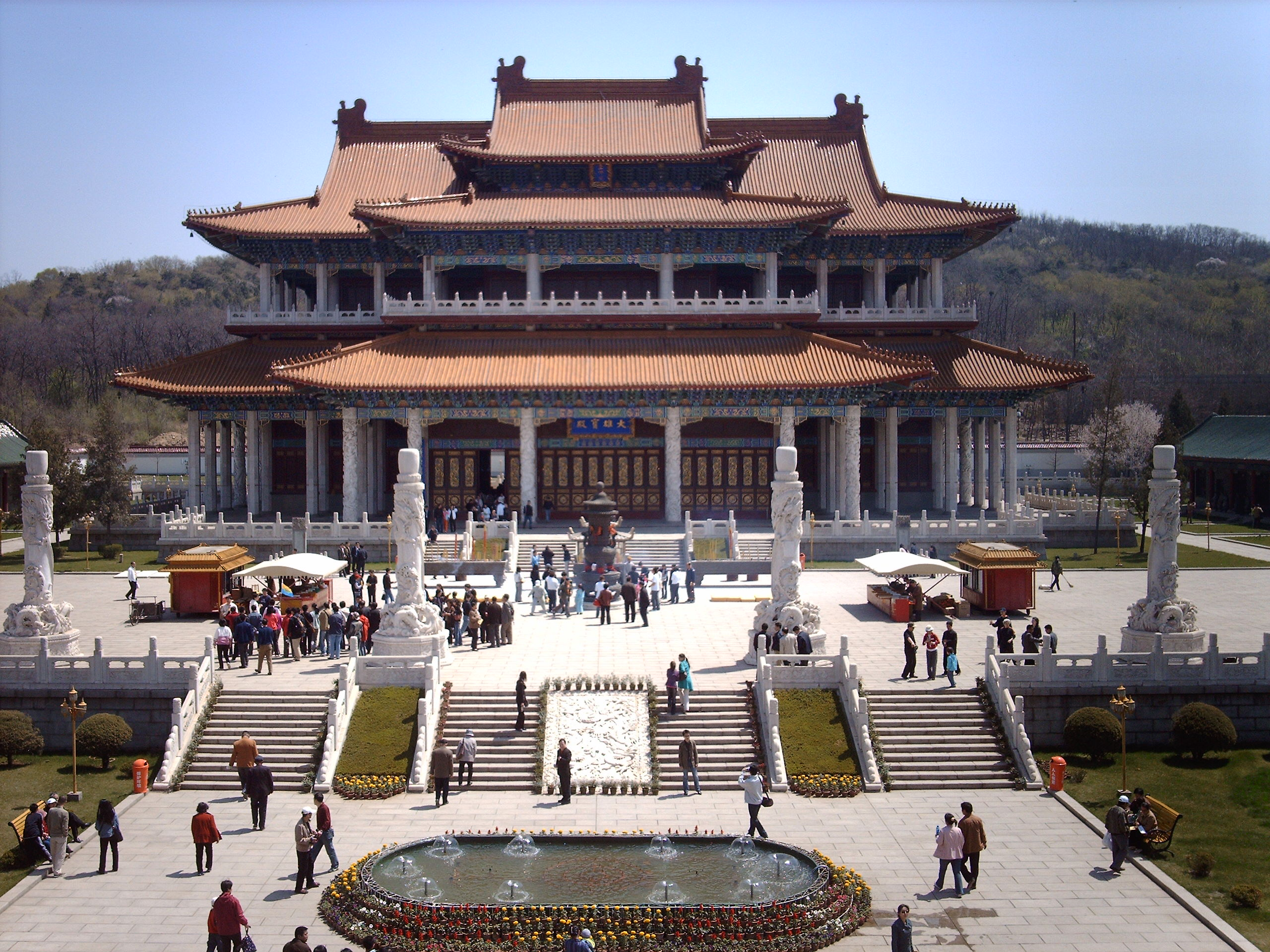
Jade Buddha Temple in Anshan

The reports did not give figures for other types of religion; around 90% of the population may be either irreligious or involved in Chinese folk religions (cults of nature deities and ancestors), Buddhism, Confucianism, Taoism, folk religious sects.

The significant Manchu population, although strongly assimilated to the Han Chinese and practicing Chinese religions, also retains its own pure Manchu shamanism. At the same time, the local religion of the Han people throughout Manchuria has developed patterns of deities, ideas, and practices inherited from Manchu and Tungus shamanism, making it quite different from central and southern Chinese folk religion. The Mongol ethnic minority either follows the Mongolian folk religion and shamanism, or Tibetan Buddhism.

== Tourism ==
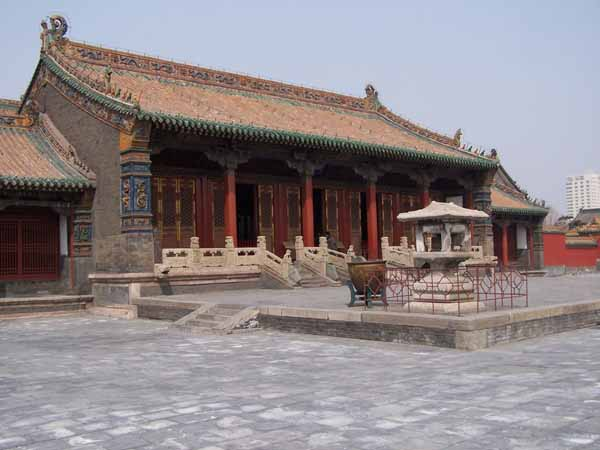
Chongzheng Hall in the Mukden Palace

The Mukden Palace was the palace of the Qing dynasty emperors before they conquered the rest of China and moved their capital to Beijing. Though not as large nor as well known as its counterpart (the Forbidden City) in Beijing, the Mukden palace is significant for its representation of palace architecture at the time, and has recently been included on the UNESCO World Heritage Site as an extension of the Imperial Palace site in Beijing.

In addition, three imperial tombs dating from the Qing dynasty are located in Liaoning. These tomb sites have been grouped with other Ming and Qing Dynasties tombs (such as the Ming dynasty tombs in Beijing, and the Ming Xiaoling Mausoleum in Nanjing) as a combined UNESCO World Heritage Site.

Wunu Mountain City, a Goguryeo site found in Huanren Manchu Autonomous County, is part of a combined UNESCO World Heritage Site that also includes sites in Ji'an, Jilin.

Benxi offers a boat ride through a large stalactite filled cave and underground river.

Anshan hosts the Jade Buddha Palace, the largest Buddha statue made of jade in the world.

Liaoyang, one of the oldest continuously inhabited cities in northeast China, has a number of historical sites, including the White Pagoda (Baita), that dates to the Liao dynasty.

The port city of Dalian, located on the tip of the Liaodong Peninsula, is a tourist destination in its own right, with beaches, resorts, zoos, seafood, shopping, Russian- and Japanese-era heritage architecture, and streetcars, a rare sight in China.

Dandong, on the border with North Korea, is a medium-sized city that offers a cross-river view of the North Korean city of Sinŭiju.

Bijia Mountain is an island which joins to the mainland at low tide by a land bridge.

== Education and research ==
Liaoning is also one of China's leading provinces in research and education. As of 2025, two major cities in Liaoning ranked in the world's top 100 cities (Dalian #42 and Shenyang #82) by scientific research output, as tracked by Nature Index.

=== Colleges and universities ===
Under the national Ministry of Education:

- Northeastern University
- Dalian University of Technology

Under various other national agencies:

- Criminal Investigation Police University of China
- Dalian Maritime University
- Dalian Nationalities University

Under the provincial government:

- China Medical University
- Shenyang Normal University
- Shenyang Medical College
- Liaoning Medical University
- Liaoning Normal University
- Liaoning Technical University
- Liaoning University
- Liaoning University of Petroleum and Chemical Technology
- Shenyang Agricultural University
- Shenyang Institute of Aeronautical Engineering
- Shenyang Institute of Chemical Technology
- Shenyang Jianzhu University
- Shenyang Ligong University
- Shenyang Pharmaceutical University
- Shenyang University
- Shenyang University of Technology
- Anshan Normal University
- Bohai University
- Dalian Jiaotong University
- Dalian Medical University
- Dalian University
- Dalian University of Foreign Languages
- Dongbei University of Finance and Economics
- Liaoning Institute of Technology
- Liaoning Radio and TV University (辽宁广播电视大学)
- Shenyang Polytechnic College (沈阳职业技术学院)

== Sports ==
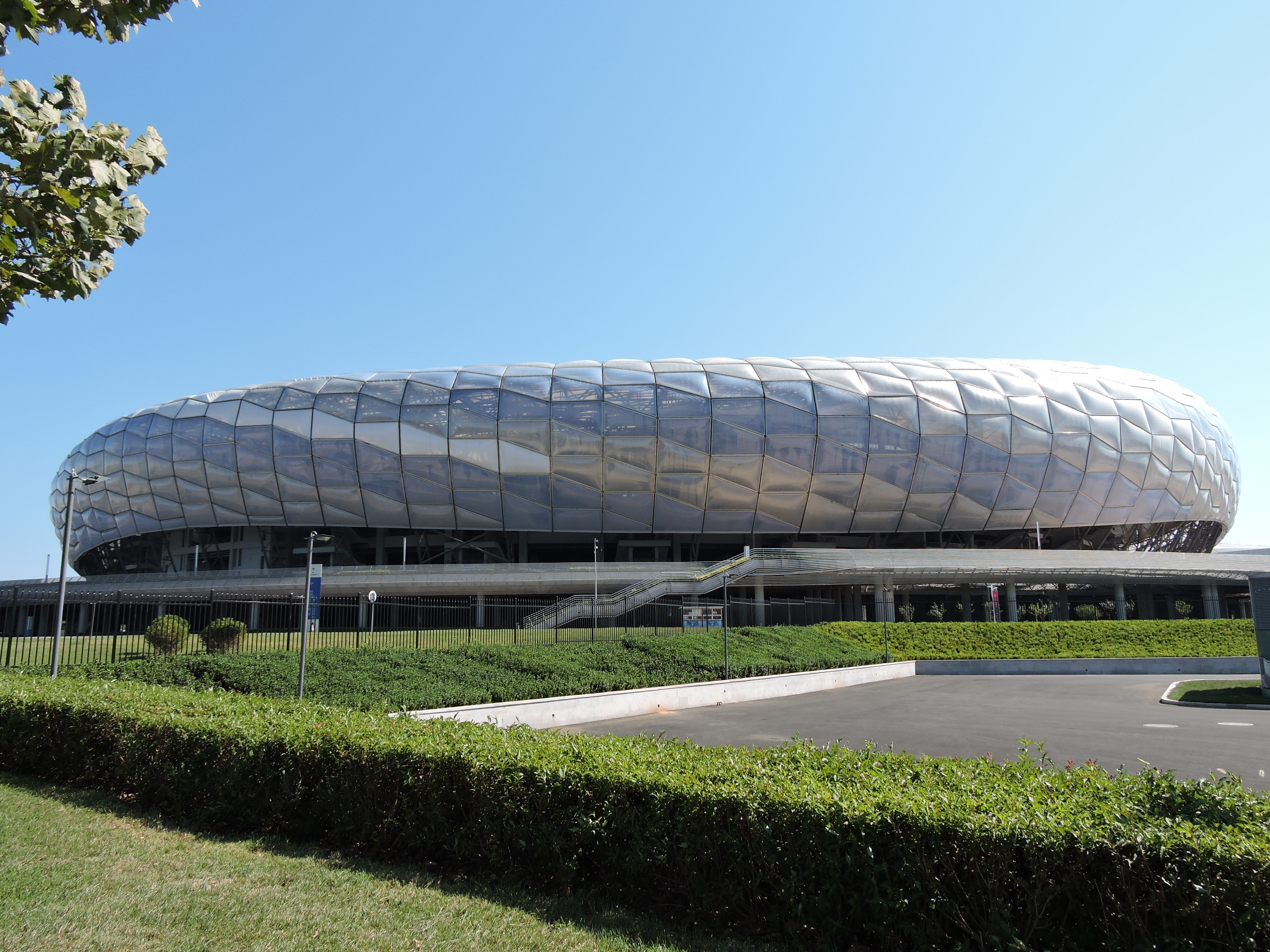
Dalian Sports Center Stadium.

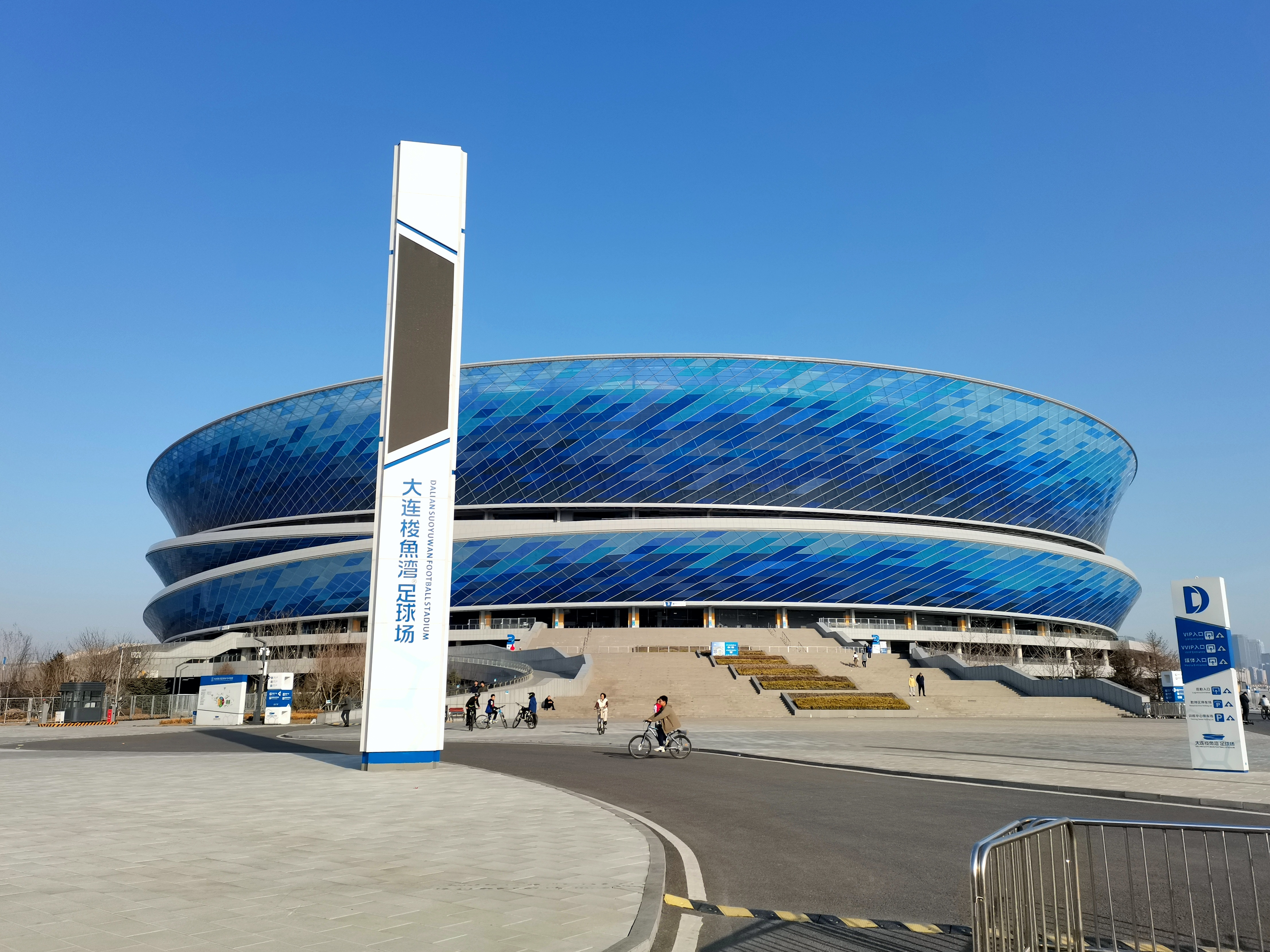
Dalian Suoyuwan Football Stadium.

Professional sports teams based in Liaoning include:

- Chinese Basketball Association
  - Liaoning Flying Leopards
  - Liaoning Hengye
- Chinese Football Association Super League (Chinese Super League)
  - Dalian Yingbo F.C.
  - Liaoning Tieren F.C.
- Chinese Football Association Jia League (China League One)
  - Dalian K'un City F.C.

== See also ==
- 2013 National Games of China
- Chaoyang North Tower
- Chinese aircraft carrier Liaoning
- Feathered Dinosaurs of China, a documentary book
- Gojoseon–Yan War
- Major national historical and cultural sites (Liaoning)
- Shenyang Mandarin
