= Feathered Dinosaurs of China =

Book by Gregory Wenzel

- Author: Gregory Wenzel
- Publication date: January 1, 2004
- ISBN: 978-1-57091562-8

Feathered Dinosaurs of China is a documentary book written and illustrated by Paleoartist, Gregory Wenzel. The book has somewhat of a plot, featuring a possible and theoretical day in the life of Chinese Animals from the Aptian stage in Liaoning.

== Plot ==
The book tells a day in the life of most fauna of Early Cretaceous Liaoning in China, 124 million BC.

=== Animals featured ===
- Unidentified Salamanders (mentioned at the beginning)
- Callobatrachus
- Unidentified Dragonflies
- Jinzhousaurus
- Unidentified Beetles (seen being kicked up by the Jinzhousaurus herd members)
- Eomaia
- Sinornithosaurus
- Eosipterus
- Dendrorhynchoides
- Unidentified Striped Fish (seen dead and being squabbled over by the 2 Pterosaurs)
- Confuciusornis
- Caudipteryx
- Manchurosuchus
- Manchurochelys
- Unidentified Freshwater Clams (seen on the lake bottom)
- Unidentified Snails (mentioned in the lake description)
- Unidentified Freshwater Crustaceans (listed in the Dragonfly nymph prey list)
- Unidentified Mayfly (nymph)
- Unidentified Predatory Fish (seen in the distance, hidden under some Water Lilies)
- Protopsephurus
- Lycoptera
- Hyphalosaurus
- Unidentified Cicadas (seen on page 20)
- Beipiaosaurus
- Sinosauropteryx
- Unidentified Lizards
- Unidentified Striped Moth (mentioned on page 23)
- Microraptor
- Psittacosaurus (dead)
- Protopteryx
- Protarchaeopteryx
