= Chaoyang North Tower =

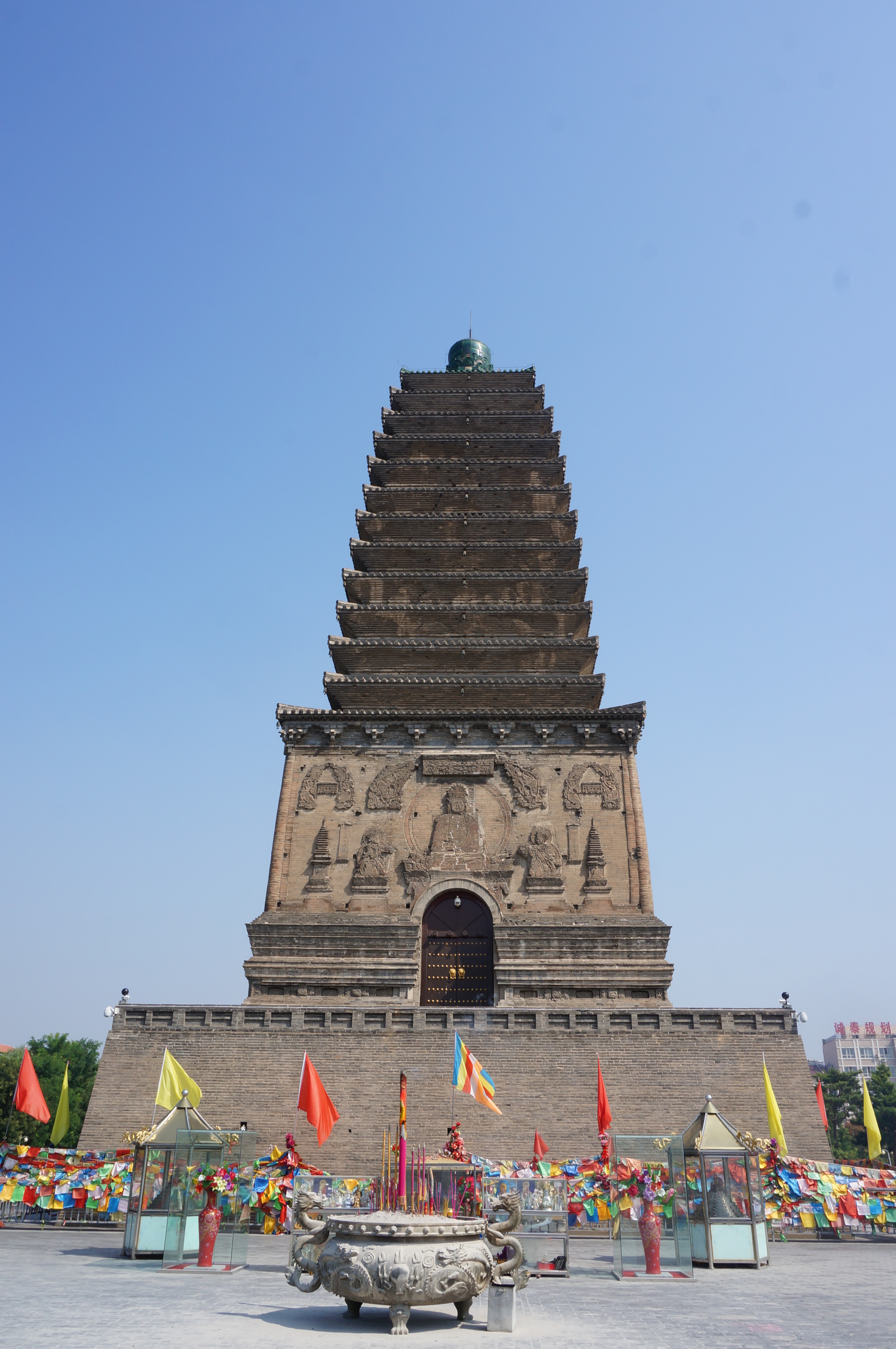
- Chaoyang North Tower, September 2015 National key cultural relics protection unit announced by the State Council of the People's Republic of China
- Interactive map of Chaoyang North Tower
- Location: Chaoyang City, Liaoning Province, China
- Coordinates: 41.5791°N 120.4564°E
- Type: ancient building
- Restored date: January 13, 1988

Chaoyang North Tower (Chinese: 朝阳北塔) is located in Shuangta District, Chaoyang City, Liaoning Province, People's Republic of China. It is named after the tower's northernmost location among the three towers in Chaoyang in the early years. The tower lacks explicit documentation in historical records. During extensive maintenance from 1984 to 1992, the archaeological team discovered the rammed earth tower foundations of the Sixteen Kingdoms period, the Northern Wei Dynasty, the Sui Dynasty, the Tang Dynasty and the Liao Dynasty beneath the Chaoyang North Tower during construction. The base of the tower was eventually combined with historical materials and other archaeological findings to discover that the existing tower was built in the Tang Dynasty and rebuilt in the Liao Dynasty. The tower is also known as the "Five Ages Pagoda" or "Pagoda of Five Ages with One Body" because the base of the tower beneath it spans five eras. The sōrin of the tower is a thirteen-story brick tower with dense eaves, 42.6 meters high, consisting of a pedestal, a semi-pedestal, a towed body, dense eaves, and a tower brake. There is a tower door on the south side of the tower, through which one can enter the heart of the tower. The highest point of the tower's core chamber can reach 27 meters, and there is an underground Palace directly below it and a celestial Palace directly above it in which two Shakyamuni relics were unearthed in 1988. In 1988, the Chaoyang North Tower was listed as a national key cultural relic protection unit.

== History ==
There are not many explicit records of the Chaoyang North Tower before the Qing Dynasty. During the large-scale maintenance from 1984 to 1992, archaeologists discovered the rammed earth tower foundations of the Sixteen Kingdoms period, the Northern Wei Dynasty, the Sui Dynasty, the Tang Dynasty, and the Liao Dynasty beneath the Chaoyang North Tower during the construction. Only after combining historical materials and other excavated artifacts did archaeologists finally establish the history of the Chaoyang North Pagoda. The tower was built during the Northern Wei Dynasty by order of Empress Dowager Feng, and was first named "Siyan Buddhism". (Note: Buddha" is an alias for "Pagoda", also known as "Futu".) The building was located on top of the original Palace building sites of the former Yan, Houyan, and Beiyan. (Note: The specific location is determined by the pillar foundation stones from the Sixteen Kingdoms period and the pagoda base from the Beiyan period discovered between 1984 and 1992.) In the second year of Renshou of the Sui Dynasty (602), a new "Fanzhuan Temple Pagoda" was built in Yingzhou on the site of the original Siyan Buddha Figure to place the Buddha relics given by Emperor Wen of the Sui Dynasty. (Note: The construction purpose and construction time of the pagoda are determined by the records of the Buddhist relics found in Tiangong and the inscription bricks found in the Liao Dynasty.) During the reign of Emperor Xuanzong Tianbao of the Tang Dynasty, the pagoda was given the name "Kaiyuan Temple Pagoda" and rebuilt again. (Note: Due to the perennial wars with the Khitan people here, the time for the tower to be built according to historical data is only during the reign of Emperor Xuanzong of the Tang Dynasty. According to the inscriptions found on the building components during the archaeological discovery and maintenance period, as well as the remnants of the Tang Dynasty stele in the foundation, it can be determined that the tower was built in the Tianbao period.) During the Liao Dynasty, the pagoda was renamed Yanchang Temple Pagoda and restored twice. The restored Chaoyang North Pagoda retains part of the eaves of the original Tang Pagoda. (Note: Determined by the inscription brick found during the maintenance process, which reads "Re-burial of the relic on April 8, 12th year of Chongxi under the "Great Pagoda of Yanchang Temple", and part of the eaves of the tower are covered with paintings, the outermost two floors were painted in the Liao Dynasty, while the third floor was painted in the Tang Dynasty; in addition, the inscription on the Stone Scripture Building in the underground palace also records that it was rebuilt in the thirteenth year of Chongxi.)

== Structure ==
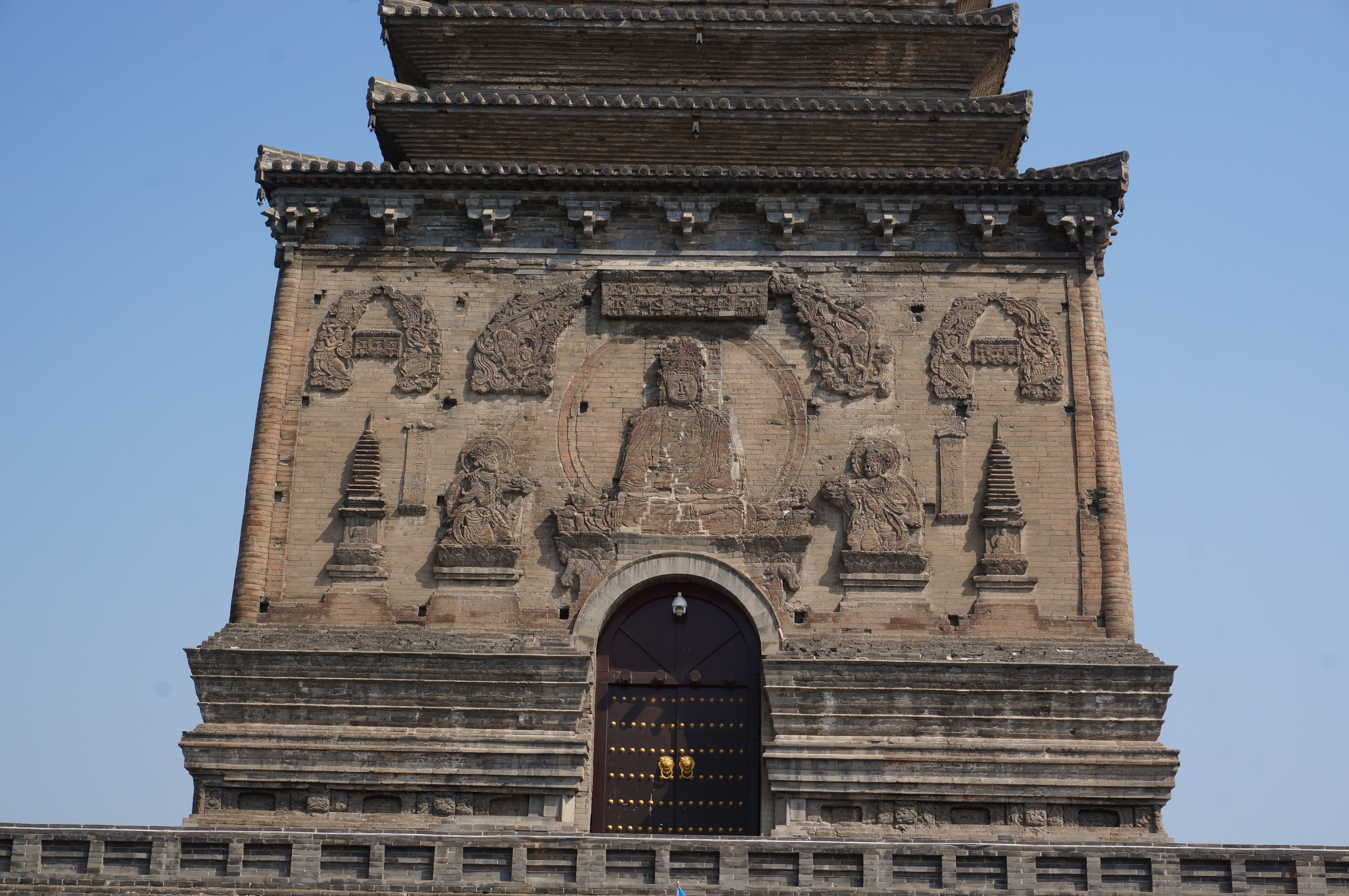

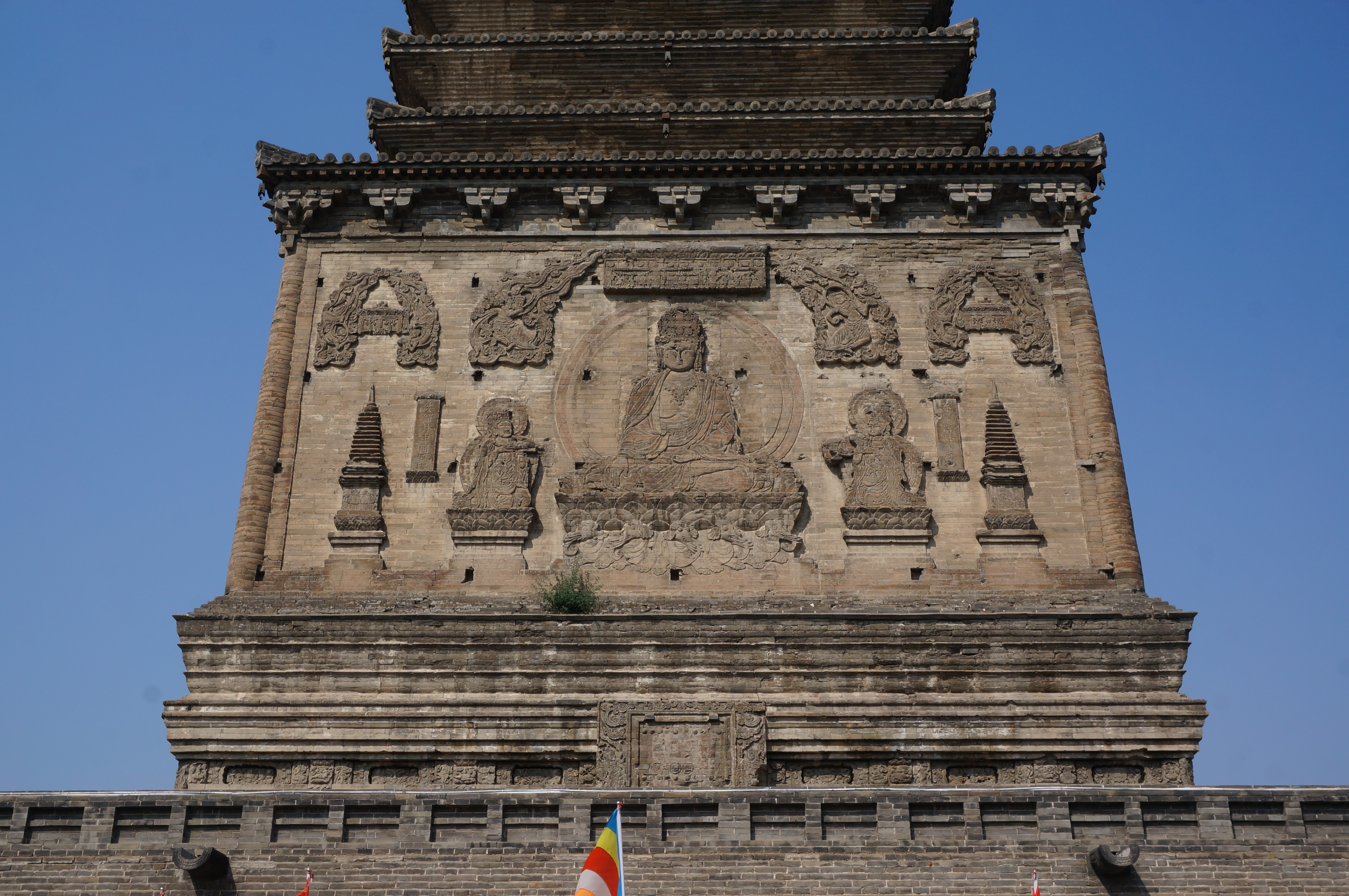
Brick sculptures on the south (top) and east (bottom) sides of the pagoda

Chaoyang North Tower is located in Shuangta District, Chaoyang City, Liaoning Province, People's Republic of China. The tower was so named because there were three towers in Chaoyang City in the early years and were located in the north. The tower is 42.6 meters high, and has a 13-stage square brick tower with a hollow cylinder, from the bottom to the top are the rammed earth foundation, brick pedestal, Xumizuo base, pagoda body, pagoda eaves, and pagoda brakes.

=== Pedestal and Xumizuo ===
The rammed earth foundation is similar in length and width, about 100 meters, and 7 meters high, and was originally the site of the Palace of North Yan Longcheng. Above the pedestal is a square pedestal made of green bricks, 26 meters wide and 5.1 meters high, with a distance of 1.3 meters from the outer edge of the pedestal to the Xumizuo. The southwest and southeast corners of the pedestal have corner steps for ascending to the top of the pedestal. The pedestal's east, south, and north directions are built with a corridor. In the corridor, one can see the pillar base stones of Beiyan and the rammed earth or brick pagoda foundations from four eras, including the Northern Wei, Sui, Tang and Liao Dynasties. Because of its special structure, the Chaoyang North Pagoda is also known as the "Pagoda of Five Generations in One House" or "Pagoda of Five Generations in One Body". Pedestals and distal are the Xumizuo, with a height of 4.35 meters and a width of 15.15 meters. The bottom part is a triple-pack lotus, and the parts above the lotus consist of a brick platform, a false door, a square, a lord, and a girdle. The south side of the Xumizuo has a door leading to the tower's heart. In addition, the east, west, and north sides are centred with false doors, all 1.95 meters high and 1.45 meters wide. The false doors on the east and west sides are flanked by statues of Rex, while the false doors on the north side are flanked by statues of Flying Heaven. There are six quarters on each side of the girdle, inside of which are carved statues of children, peonies, lotuses, dancers, musicians, etc. The central chamber of the pagoda enters through the south coupon door of the Sumeru pedestal. It is square in plan, 27 meters high, large at the bottom and smaller at the top, with 5.7 meters at the bottom side and only 0.86 meters at the top. Inside is a statue of the Dainichi Buddha.

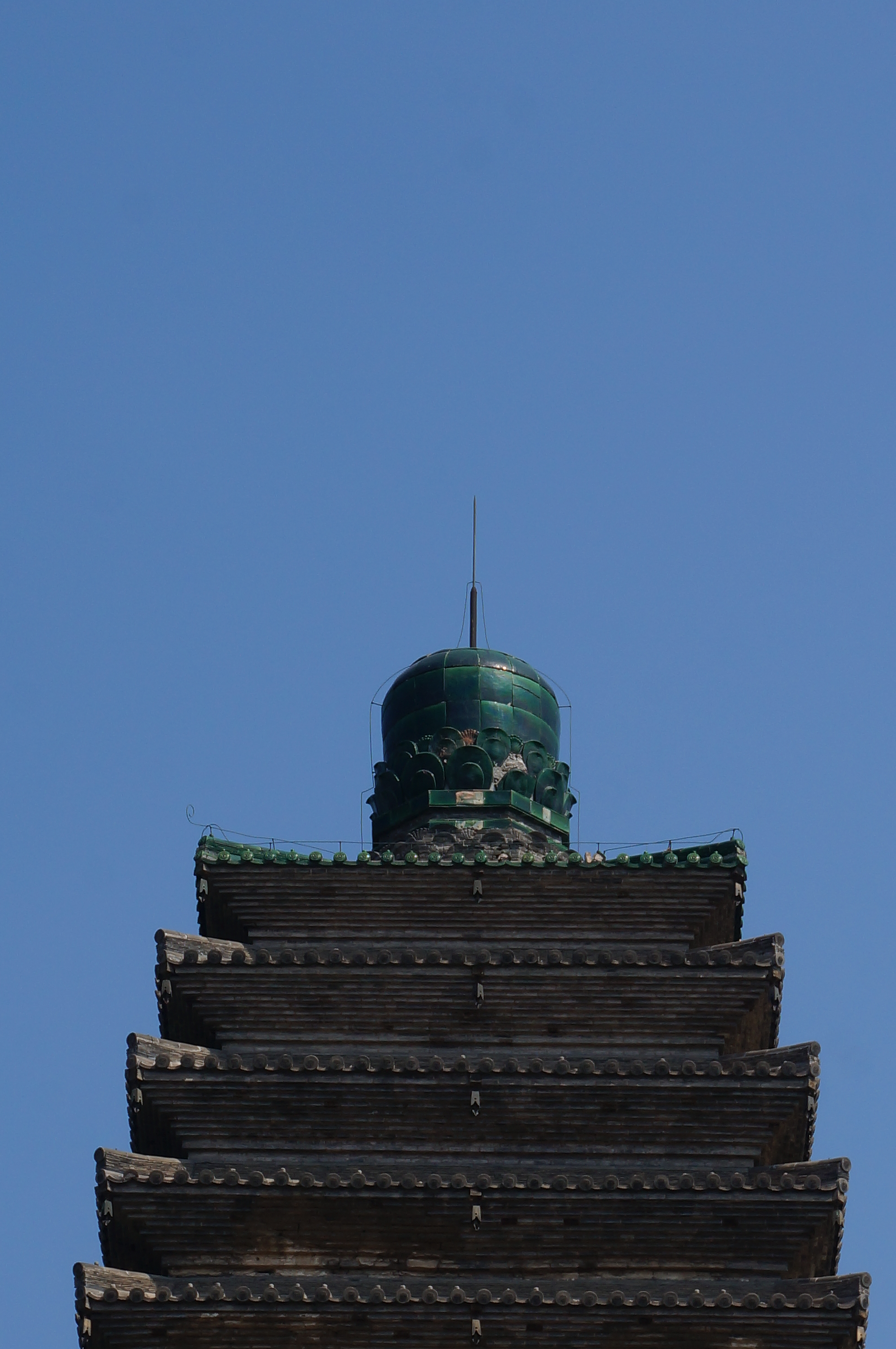
Tasha

=== Tower body ===
The pagoda is located on top of the Xumizuo Throne and is 6.32 meters high. There are brick-carved leaning pillars at all four corners, with a lower threshold at the bottom and a brick-carved frontal square at the top, with large eaves above the frontal square. The pagoda is surrounded by brick statues, in the centre of each side (a Tantric Vajradhara Buddha), all wearing a crown, necklace and robe, sitting cross-legged. On the east side is Akshobhya with five elephant seats; on the west side is Amitabha with five peacock seats; on the north side is Bujinkan Buddhism with five winged golden bird seats; and on the south side is Baosheng Buddha with two horse seats. Each statue is flanked by a Bodhisattva, the shape of each Bodhisattva being the same. On the inner side of the structure stands a monument engraved with the name of the pagoda. The pagodas are in clockwise order from the southeast side as follows: The pagoda of the birthplace in the Palace of the King of Pure Rice, the pagoda of Buddhahood under the Bodhi Tree, the pagoda of the Wheel of Dharma in the Deer Park, the pagoda of the name of the Garden of Solitude, the pagoda of the treasure steps at the edge of the city of Quemoy, the pagoda of the Prajna at Mt Kakuhori. In addition to the east side of the Spiritual Pagoda body is the statue of Shakyamuni Nirvana, on the north side of the east side is the statue of Vimala Maharaja, and the rest of the six spirit pagodas are carved with the seated statue of Sakyamuni.

=== Eaves and brakes ===
The eaves portion of the tower has 13 floors in total, the first to the eleventh floors having been transformed from the eaves of the fourth to the fourteenth floors of the Sui Tang Pagoda, and the twelfth and thirteenth floors having been both reconstructed in the Liao Dynasty. The first floor is an imitation wood, brick arch with a large eave which is 1.64 meters high and 1.96 meters out. From the second story onwards, the eaves of the tower are gradually divided. Above the eaves, part of the tower is the tower brake. The base of this pagoda is a brick octagonal rosette. The rosette is surmounted by a girdle and a green glass glazed rosette with an overlapping bowl above the rosette.

The middle of the twelfth floor of the tower eaves, above the top of the tower's core chamber, is the Heavenly Palace that can be divided into three parts: the doorway, the canal, and the Palace room, of which the doorway opening to the south is 1.03 meters long, 1.43 meters wide and 1.72 meters high, and the canal on the north side of the doorway which is 1.2 meters long from north to south, 1.8 meters wide from east to west and 1.72 meters high. The canal's northern end is a square Palace room, with a side length of 1.39 meters and a height of 1.27 meters. The tops of the Palace rooms and doorways are covered with wooden panels, The tower is above the wooden board, and the interior surfaces were originally painted with white plaster, which has fallen off. The entire celestial Palace shows clear traces of burning after being struck by lightning.

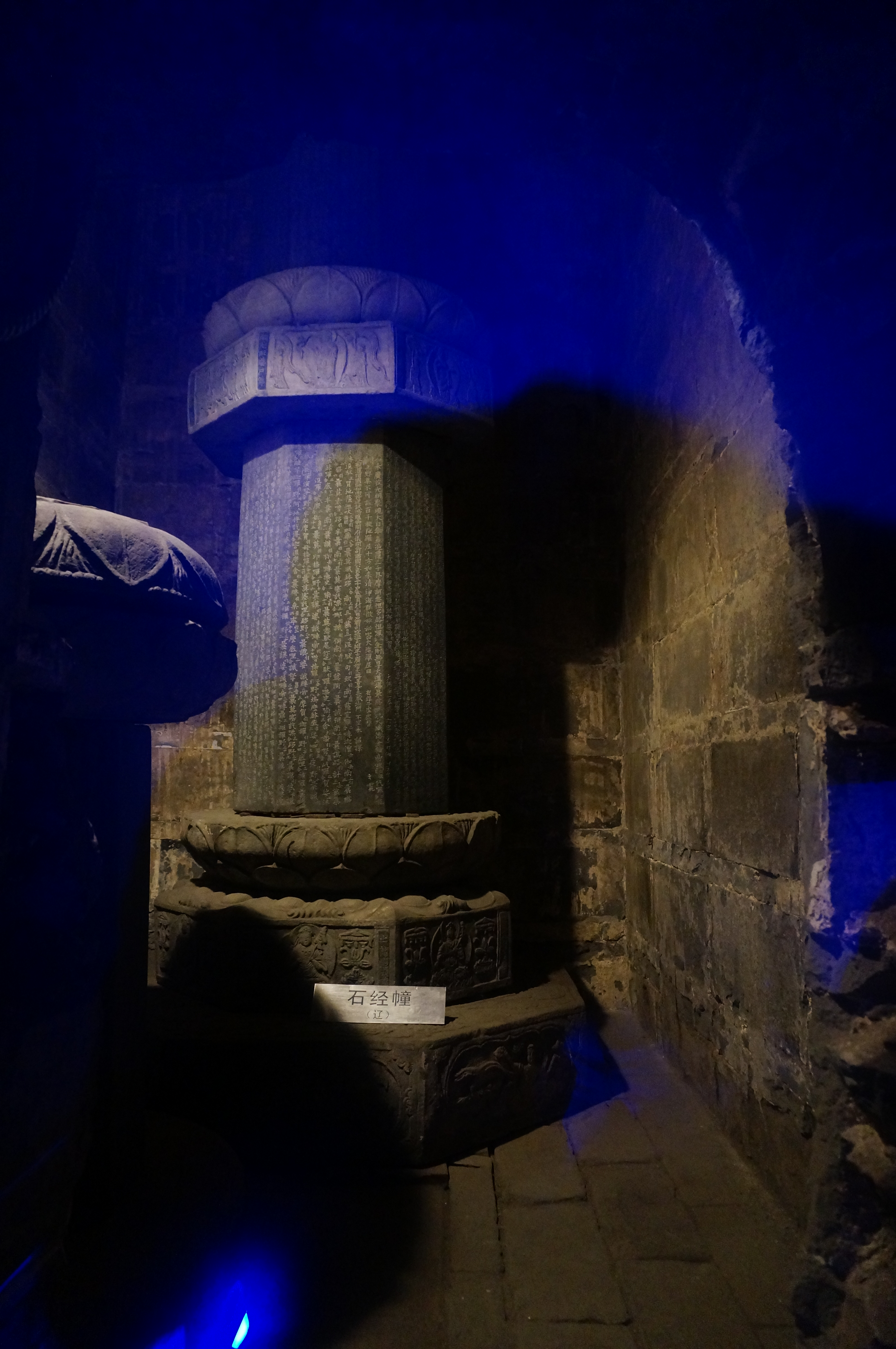
Underground Palace and Stone Scripture Building

=== Underground Palace ===
The corridor on the south side of the pedestal leads to the underground Palace which is under the tower. The underground Palace is 4.48 meters high, 1.76 meters long from east to west and 2.05 meters long from north to south. The perimeter and floor are made of green bricks and caulked with white plaster, the top is made of cypress wood panels which have been stolen in the past, and the interior was severely disturbed at the time of discovery. There is a square hole in the south wall of the underground Palace, under the tower, which leads upward to the heart chamber of the tower. There is a stone sutra building in the middle of the Palace room, and a stone scripture building in the middle of it, which is made of sandstone, octagonal in plan, and can be divided into three sections from bottom to top, except for one section which was found upside down on the ground, and the other three sections were stacked. After restoration, the whole body is 5.26 meters high. The bottom for the first section of the seat can be divided into three parts, the bottom being octagonal and having 1.21 meters in diameter, of which four sides are carved with a faceplate, and the rest carved with a sky; the second layer, containing a Bodhisattva statue in relief on the side; the third tier being the round seat of the supine lotus. The second section seat is octagonal, the seven Buddhas of the past are carved on the top, and each of them is flanked by a Bodhisattva. The third section of the pedestal is carved with the eight spiritual pagodas and the names of the pagodas with the seven Buddhas of Medicine inscribed on the sidebar. The fourth section of the pedestal is carved with the story of the relics being divided among the kings of the eight kingdoms. Above the fourth section of the pedestal is the body of the building, and the side of the building is carved with sutras as "The Great Buddha's Dawn Sutra," "The Great Sukhavati Sutra," "The Heart Sutra of Prajna Paramita," "Buddha's Sutra of Great Destruction and Longevity," "The Buddha's Dawn Sutra of Dignity and Victory," "The Great Wheel Sutra," and "The Hundred Characters of the Mahayana Tantra," with the inscription of the engraver at the end, which is dated "the thirteenth year of Chongxi".

== Cultural relics ==
In 1973, archaeologists excavated one Northern Wei Buddha statue and four Tang Dynasty Rex statues from the southeast corner of the pedestal.

In 1986, archaeologists discovered a large number of artefacts in the Heavenly Palace and the Earthly Palace. In addition to the stone letter, a total of one gold relic tower, one gold-covered agate relic jar, one gilt silver tower, one sutra tower, one burnt wooden and silver coffin, one treasure cover, three gilt bronze Bodhisattva statues, four silver Bodhi trees, one lantern-shaped silver ornament, eight silver dishes with dragon pattern and fancy mouth, ten copper dishes with a fancy mouth, one silver jar, one silver capsule box, one silver vase with cylinder shape, nine bronze mirrors, and two Shakyamuni true relics inside the gold-covered agate jar were unearthed in the Heavenly Palace. (Note: Origin was questioned when it was first unearthed, but was finally determined in 2003.) In addition, there is one white porcelain net vase with a lotus pattern, nine white porcelain square plates with butterfly text, seven white porcelain round plates, two white porcelain jars containing items such as copper coins and medicinal herbs, one glass vase with gold lid in the shape of a bird and one glass vase with seven prisms, two jade jades, two jade rings, one onyx axe, one amber disc dragon, one jade flying heaven, one jade goose, and more than 400 copper coins. In addition to this, there are clear remnants of burned silk fabrics in the Heavenly Palace.

There is one green sandstone stone letter, one white porcelain lion and mother, three white porcelain square plates with fancy mouths, four round plates with fancy mouths, two white porcelain bowls, seven porcelain plates, and one porcelain jar in the underground Palace. In addition, there were a total of 374 bead ornaments made of crystal, jade, agate, and amber, 2 bamboo carved figures, 33 bronze coins, and 5 bronze ornaments. The archaeologists also found a large number of porcelain fragments in the square hole, as well as one bronze rosette and 148 bronze coins.

== Protection ==
Due to a previous lightning strike, the top of the eaves of the Chaoyang North Pagoda showed significant damage in the early 1980s. From August 1984 to December 1992, the State Administration of Cultural Heritage of the People's Republic of China allocated funds for a comprehensive repair and inspection of the Chaoyang North Tower, and after the maintenance project, the Chaoyang North Tower was restored to its original appearance. In 1990, a special museum of Buddhist culture was established based on the Chaoyang North Pagoda, namely the Chaoyang North Pagoda Museum. In 1988, the North Tower of Chaoyang was listed as a national key cultural relic protection unit. In 2003, the Chaoyang North Tower was renovated again to match the transformation of the old city of Chaoyang. In 2004, the North Tower Plaza centred on the Chaoyang North Tower, was completed and opened to the public. In the same year, the new site of the Chaoyang Beita Museum was completed and officially opened to the public in 2006. In 2015, the Liaoning Provincial Cultural Resources Construction Service Center filmed a documentary for Chaoyang Beita.
