= List of universities and colleges in Liaoning =

The following is List of Universities and Colleges in Liaoning.

Name	Chinese name	Type	Location	Note
Liaoning University	辽宁大学	Provincial	Shenyang	
Dalian University of Technology	大连理工大学	National (Direct)	Dalian	Ω
Shenyang University of Technology	沈阳工业大学	Provincial	Shenyang	
Shenyang Aerospace University	沈阳航空航天大学	Provincial	Shenyang	
Shenyang Ligong University	沈阳理工大学	Provincial	Shenyang	
Northeastern University	东北大学	National (Direct)	Shenyang	Ω
University of Science and Technology Liaoning	辽宁科技大学	Provincial	Anshan	
Liaoning Technical University	辽宁工程技术大学	Provincial	Fuxin	
Liaoning University of Petroleum and Chemical Technology	辽宁石油化工大学	Provincial	Fushun	
Shenyang University of Chemical Technology	沈阳化工大学	Provincial	Shenyang	
Dalian Jiaotong University	大连交通大学	Provincial	Dalian	
Dalian Maritime University	大连海事大学	National (Other)	Dalian	
Dalian Polytechnic University	大连工业大学	Provincial	Dalian	
Shenyang Jianzhu University	沈阳建筑大学	Provincial	Shenyang	
Liaoning University of Technology	辽宁工业大学	Provincial	Jinzhou	
Shenyang Agricultural University	沈阳农业大学	Provincial	Shenyang	
Dalian Ocean University	大连海洋大学	Provincial	Dalian	
China Medical University	中国医科大学	Provincial	Shenyang	
Jinzhou Medical University	锦州医科大学	Provincial	Jinzhou	
Dalian Medical University	大连医科大学	Provincial	Dalian	
Liaoning University of Traditional Chinese Medicine	辽宁中医药大学	Provincial	Shenyang	
Shenyang Pharmaceutical University	沈阳药科大学	Provincial	Shenyang	
Shenyang Medical College	沈阳医学院	Provincial	Shenyang	
Liaoning Normal University	辽宁师范大学	Provincial	Dalian	
Shenyang Normal University	沈阳师范大学	Provincial	Shenyang	
Bohai University	渤海大学	Provincial	Jinzhou	
Anshan Normal University	鞍山师范大学	Provincial	Anshan	
Dalian University of Foreign Languages	大连外国语大学	Provincial	Dalian	
Dongbei University of Finance and Economics	东北财经大学	Provincial	Dalian	
Criminal Investigation Police University of China	中国刑事警察学院	National (Other)	Shenyang	
Shenyang Sport University	沈阳体育学院	Provincial	Shenyang	
Shenyang Conservatory of Music	沈阳音乐学院	Provincial	Shenyang	
Lu Xun Academy of Fine Arts	鲁迅美术学院	Provincial	Shenyang	
Shenyang University	沈阳大学	Provincial	Shenyang	
Dalian University	大连大学	Provincial	Dalian	
Liaoning Institute of Science and Technology	辽宁科技学院	Provincial	Benxi	
Liaoning Police College	辽宁警察学院	Provincial	Dalian	
Shenyang Institute of Engineering	沈阳工程学院	Provincial	Shenyang	
Eastern Liaoning University	辽东学院	Provincial	Dandong	
Dalian Minzu University	大连民族大学	National (Other)	Dalian	
Shenyang Institute of Technology	沈阳工学院	Private	Shenyang	
Dalian Institute of Science and Technology	大连科技学院	Private	Dalian	
Shenyang Urban Construction University	沈阳城市建设学院	Private	Shenyang	
Haihua College, Liaoning Normal University	辽宁师范大学海华学院	Private	Shenyang	
He University	辽宁何氏医学院	Private	Shenyang	
Dalian Neusoft University of Information	大连东软信息学院	Private	Dalian	
Liaoning Finance and Trade College	辽宁财贸学院	Private	Huludao	
Yingkou Institute of Technology	营口理工学院	Provincial	Yingkou	
