= List of universities and colleges in Shenyang =

This is a list of universities and colleges in Shenyang, Liaoning Province, China:

- Liaoning University (辽宁大学)
- Liaoning University of Traditional Chinese Medicine (辽宁中医药大学)
- Northeastern University (China) (东北大学)
- Shenyang Aerospace University (沈阳航空大学)
- Shenyang Jianzhu University (沈阳建筑大学)
- Shenyang Ligong University (沈阳理工大学)
- Shenyang Normal University (沈阳师範大学)
- Shenyang University (沈阳大学)
- Shenyang University of Technology (沈阳工业大学)
