= Dong Seoul University =

University in Seongnam, South Korea

Coordinates: 37°27′34.78″N 127°7′46.35″E

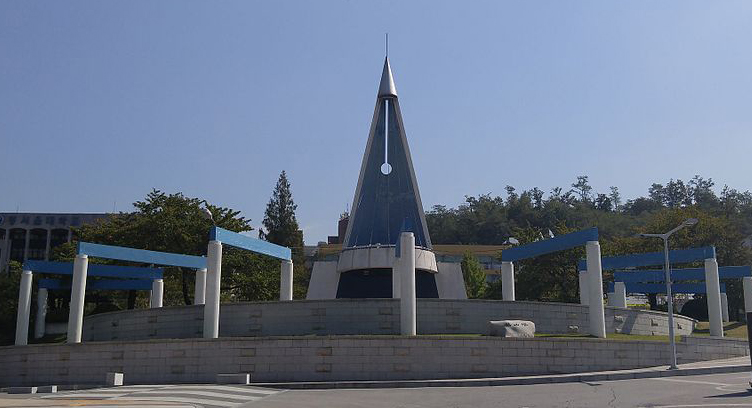
- Established: 1976
- President: Kwang-sup Yoo
- Location: Seongnam, South Korea
- Website: http://www.dsc.ac.kr/

- Dong Seoul University
- Hangul: 동서울대학교
- Hanja: 東서울大學校
- RR: Dongseoul daehakgyo
- MR: Tongsŏul taehakkyo

Dong Seoul University (Korean: 동서울대학교) is a private technical university in Seongnam, South Korea. The current president is Kwang-sup Yoo.

== Location ==
The school is located in Bokjeong-dong of Sujeong District in the city of Seongnam. The campus lies between the Bokjeong and Gachon University stations.

== Departments and divisions ==
There are 24 departments and 2 divisions offered by the Dong Seoul University which are Aerospace, Automobile & Mechanical Engineering, Electrical Information Control, Digital Electronics, Information And Communication, Computer Software, Architecture, Computer Information, Broadcasting & Media, Interior Design, Horology And Jewelry, Game Contents, Tourism, Practical Art, Industrial Design, Visual Communication Design, Fashion Design, Child Care & Education, Beauty Coordination, Silver Welfare, Airlines Service, Business Administration, Chinese Business, Sports Science, Acting, Applied Music and General Education.

== History ==
Dong Seoul University was established in 1976 with 4 departments and 880 students.

=== Timeline ===
==== 1970s ====
Jesuk Institution for Education was founded with Park Duk-son as its first Chief Director. The first matriculation ceremony was held with 880 new students. Building One and Two were completed and Park Yeou-soon was inaugurated as the first president. The Student Press was launched during these years.

==== 1980s ====
The first commencement ceremony was held with 625 graduates. During these years the Broadcasting Studio, Computer Center, Building Three and Five, Administration Building were completed. The Student Guidance Center was opened and the Institute of Industrial Technology was established.

==== 1990s ====
The name of the Institution for Education was changed to Haksan. Building Six, Seven and the Haksan Library were completed in these years and the Student Union Building was opened. In 1998, the Language Teaching Center was established and the name of the school was once again changed to Dong Seoul University.

==== 2000s ====
Dong Seoul University established a sisterhood relationship with Zhejiang University Of Technology and a partnership was formed with Shenyang Ligong University, both in China. In 2008, the school later established another sisterhood relationship with China's Dalian University. During these years, Dong Seoul University was selected by the Ministry of Labor as part of the Plan for the Development of Regional Human Resources, the Plan for Industry–Academia Cooperation by Seongnam City and the Plan for Youth Internships for SMEs, and by the Ministry of Education, Science and Technology as part of the Plan for the Improvement of Educational Capability.

==== 2010 ====
Dong Seoul University was selected as a Class A University for the College Brand Support Project and as an excellent university for the project of the Improvement of Educational Capabilities.

== Sister universities ==
There are total of 21 sister universities.

=== China ===
1. Yantai Nanshan University
2. Hebei Normal University
3. Shenyang Ligong University
4. Shenyang University of Technology
5. Zhejiang University of Technology
6. Dalian University
7. Capital University of Economics and Business
8. Shenyang University

=== Japan ===
1. Kake Educational Institution
2. Shobi University
3. Kurashiki University of Science and the Arts
4. Chiba Institute of Science
5. Kibi International University
6. Kyushu University of Health and Welfare

=== United States ===
1. Long Island University
2. College of the Desert
3. Hawaii Pacific University
4. University of Guam

=== Australia ===
1. Queensland University of Technology
2. University of Newcastle
3. Bond University

== Notable people ==
- Heo Young-saeng, singer (SS501 and Double S 301)
- Seo Kang-joon, actor and singer (5urprise)
- Ong Seong-wu, actor and singer (Wanna One)
- Park So-hyun, singer (TripleS)

== See also ==
- List of universities and colleges in South Korea
- Education in South Korea
