= LMU =

LMU or lmu as abbreviation may refer to:

== Education ==
- Lambung Mangkurat University in Banjarmasin and Banjarbaru (South Kalimantan, Indonesia)
- Leeds Metropolitan University, name of Leeds Beckett University (LBU) in Leeds (West Yorkshire, England, United Kingdom) until 2014
- Liaoning Medical University, name of Jinzhou Medical University (JZMU) in Jinzhou city (Liaoning province, northeastern China) until 2016
- Lincoln Memorial University in Harrogate (Tennessee, United States)
- London Metropolitan University in London (England, United Kingdom)
- Loyola Marymount University in Los Angeles (California, United States)
- LMU Munich (German: Ludwig-Maximilians-Universität München) in Munich (Bavaria, Germany)

== Other uses ==
- AlMasria Universal Airlines (ICAO designator), an Egyptian airline
- Lamenu (ISO 639-3 language code), an Oceanic language
- Latin Monetary Union, a unified system of coinage until the year 1926
- Le Mans Ultimate, the official video game of the FIA World Endurance Championship (WEC)
- Late Middle Ukrainian, a period of the Ukrainian language in the mid and late 18th century
