= Kim Moo-jeon =

South Korean businessman (born 1982)

Kim Moo-Jeon
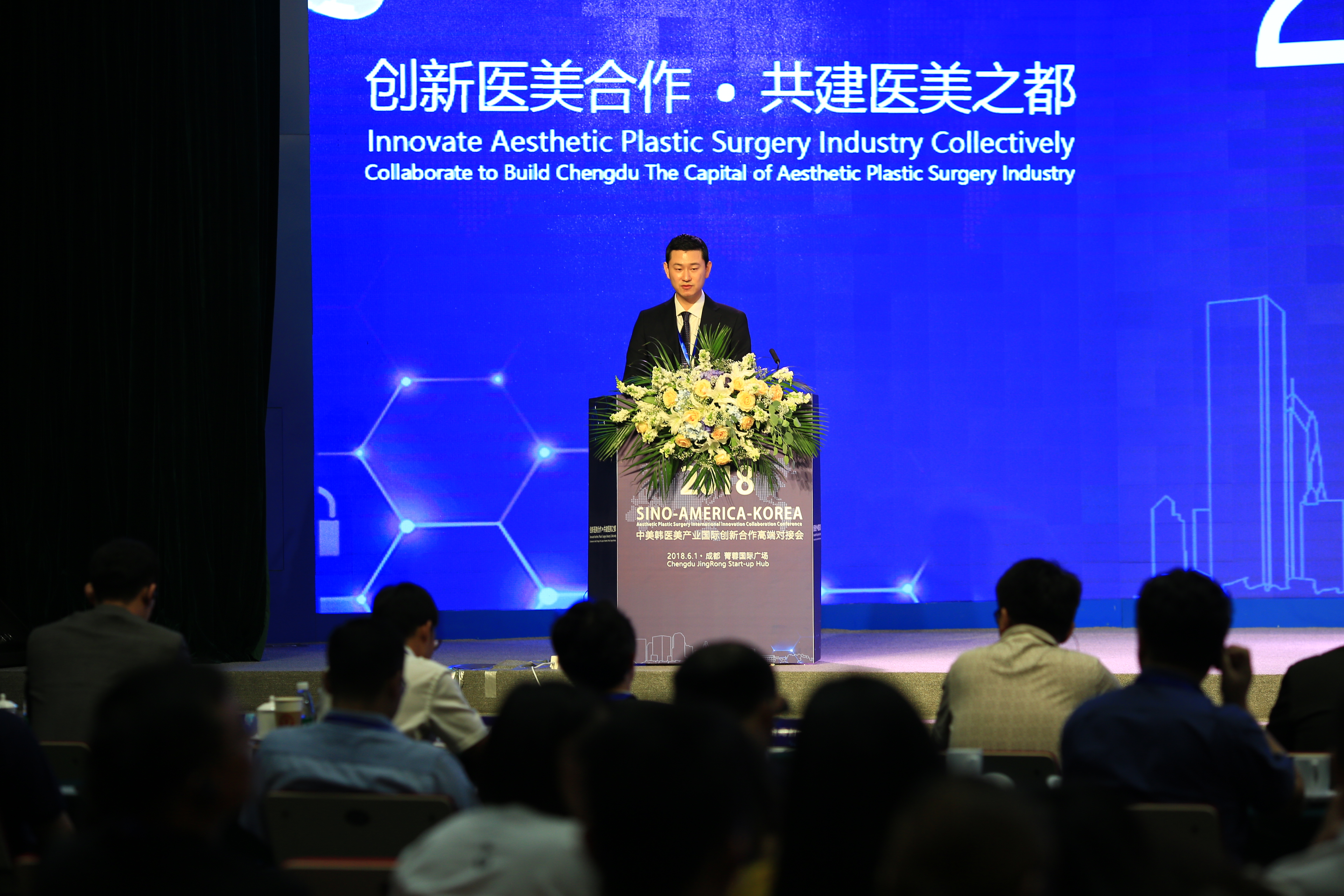
- Born: May 6, 1982 (age 44); Republic of Korea
- Education: Liaoning University of Traditional Chinese Medicine
- Occupation: businessman
- Years active: 1982–present

Korean name
- Hangul: 김무전
- Hanja: 金武典
- RR: Gim Mujeon
- MR: Kim Mujŏn

Kim Moo-Jeon (Korean: 김무전; Chinese: 金武典; born May 6, 1982) is a South Korean businessman. Born in Seoul, he began his studies in China in 1995 and graduated from Liaoning University of Traditional Chinese Medicine in 2004. In June 2016, he collaborated with Xiaomi E&M to provide and manage Korean internet broadcasting content on Xiaomi's platform, including the Xiaomi Zwo app, and offered a variety of closed beta services. He is the CEO of CKDOT Holdings and Korea MCN. Additionally, he is a vice president of the M.O.K Group, chairman of the Medical Industry Association of Korea, and head of the Korean Aesthetic Plastic Surgery Industry Association.

== Awards ==
- The 7th Global Donation Culture and Culture Contributions Awards 2016
- 2016 Global Proud Korean Award
