= Wu Bing'an =

Chinese ethnographer

Wu Bing'an (Chinese: 乌丙安; 3 November 1928 – 11 July 2018) was a Chinese ethnologist and an expert on folklore and popular culture. He was a professor of Liaoning University and served as President of the Chinese Folklore Society.

== Biography ==
Wu was born on 3 November 1928 in Hohhot, Inner Mongolia. After university, he became a graduate student at Beijing Normal University in 1953, specializing in folk literature. From 1955, he taught at Liaoning University in Shenyang for 45 years. Although he officially retired in 1998, he continued teaching and researching for another 20 years, and taught as an adjunct or visiting professor at 18 universities in China and abroad. He devoted much of his life to field research. Even in his eighties, he explored and studied remote villages in mountainous regions with poor living conditions.

In a 2017 poll organized by the Guangming Daily, Wu received the most votes as one of the "10 most important people" for China's intangible cultural heritage. In 2018, the China Federation of Literary and Art Circles honoured him, together with Feng Jicai, with the Lifetime Achievement Award in Folk Art and Literature.

Wu fell ill in April 2018, and sought treatment in Germany. He died of cancer in Berlin on 11 July 2018, at the age of 89.

== Selected works ==
- 中国民间信仰 [Popular Belief in China]. Shanghai People's Publishing House. 1996. ISBN 9787208020139.
- 非物质文化遗产保护理论与方法 [Theories and Methods in the Protection of Intangible Cultural Heritage]. Art and Literature Press. 2010. ISBN 978-7-5039-4577-9.
- 民俗文化综论 [A Review of Folk Culture]. Changchun Publishing House. 2014. ISBN 978-7-5445-3200-6.
- 萨满信仰研究 [Research on Shamanism]. Changchun Publishing House. 2014. ISBN 978-7-5445-3198-6.
