= Momo Wang =

Chinese fashion designer

Momo Wang, born Wang Tianmo (Chinese: 王天墨; born 1987), is a Chinese fashion designer.

== Biography ==
=== Early life and education ===
Wang was raised in Jinzhou, Liaoning, China. Her father is a calligrapher and artist and her mother was a journalist who enjoys making clothes. As a child, most of Wang's clothes were made by her mother. She was dedicated to her schoolwork.

Wang attended Peking University and studied intercultural communication. There, she learned about Peking opera, calligraphy, and traditional Chinese art. In her second year of university, Wang rented a basement studio in Beijing and purchased a sewing machine. She developed an interest in sewing, making items such as bags and skirts.

After a professor suggested she study fashion design, she applied to Central Saint Martins without any formal training and was accepted to the fashion print course. Wang moved to London in 2007. While studying at Saint Martins, Wang supported herself by "selling handmade brooches and accessories from a stall in Brick Lane." In her first term at the school, she found the coursework difficult and failed her first two projects; however, she practiced over the summer and went on to "excel." Wang graduated in June 2011. Her graduating collection included "folky hand-crafted peasant costumes from around the world, a riotous blend of colour, print and texture for which she was awarded joint second place in the L'Oréal Professionel Young Talent Award." The show was titled I Love My Print Room and earned Wang three awards from Saint Martins.

=== Career ===
In 2012, Wang established a personal studio called Mending Point in London. The same year, Wang designed the 12-piece Third Hand UpCycle collection. The collection was designed using materials purchased from secondhand markets in Jinzhou. The inspiration for the collection came from the French philosopher Derrida and his "third hand" concept. Eco Fashion Talk characterized the collection as a "wonderful, brilliantly colored creative experimentation in repurposing found materials."

In 2013, Wang launched an independent fashion label called Museum of Friendship.

For her debut at Shanghai Fashion Week, Wang showcased a collection titled After School. That's Shanghai described the collection as "Harajaku-meets-Saved by the Bell".

=== Personal life ===
Wang currently lives and works in Los Angeles.
