= Feng Jicai =

Chinese author (born 1942)

- 冯骥才
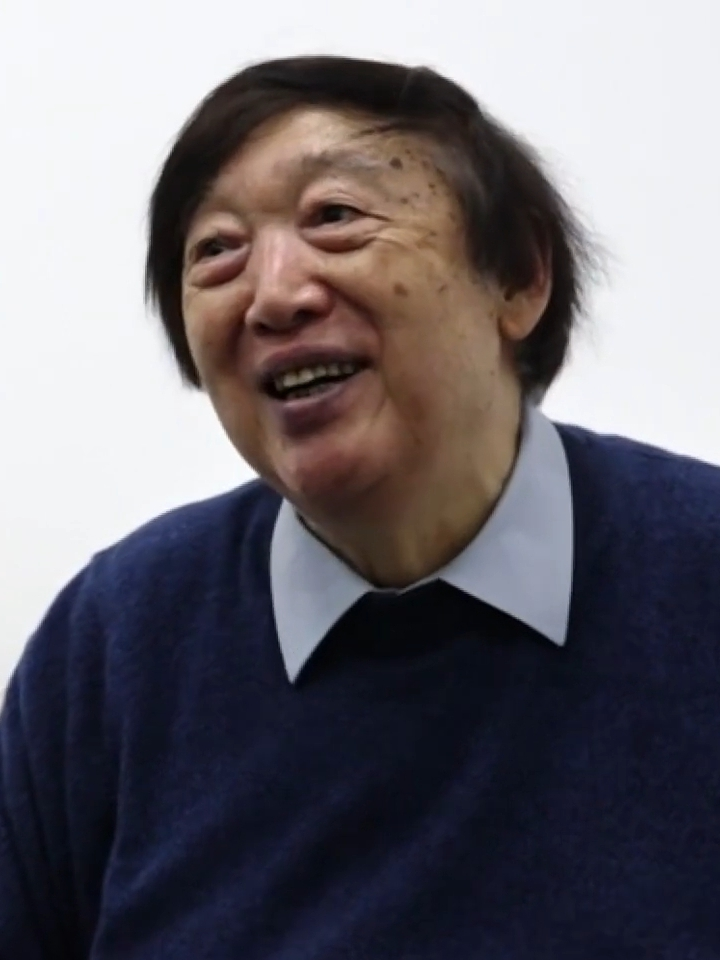
- Feng in 2023
- Born: 1942 (age 83–84); Tianjin, China
- Occupations: Author, artist and literary scholar

Feng Jicai (simplified Chinese: 冯骥才; traditional Chinese: 馮驥才; pinyin: Féng Jìcái) is a contemporary Chinese author, artist and cultural scholar.

== Biography ==
Born in Tianjin in 1942 to a family originally from Ningbo, Zhejiang province, Feng rose to prominence as a pioneer of the Scar Literature movement that emerged after the Cultural Revolution. He has published close to one hundred literary works that span a number of different topics, styles and genres. His major works include Ah!, The Carved Pipe, The Tall Woman and Her Short Husband, The Miraculous Pigtail, Three Inch Golden Lotus, Zebra Finches, Ten Years of Madness: Oral Histories of China's Cultural Revolution, and Extraordinary People in Our Ordinary World. His work has been translated into English, French, German, Italian, Japanese, Russian, Dutch, Spanish, Korean and Vietnamese; internationally, more than forty of his literary works have been published.

Feng is also a cultural scholar. He proposed and directed the Project to Save Chinese Folk Cultural Heritages, and over the last two decades he has campaigned to preserve urban culture and traditional villages.

Feng is currently an honorary member of the Literature and Arts Association, honorary president of the China Folk Literature and Art Association, and an adviser to the State Council. He is also dean, professor and PhD supervisor at the Feng Jicai Institute of Literature and Art, Tianjin University, vice chair of the National Intangible Cultural Heritage Evaluation Group, and director of the China Traditional Village Protection Expert Committee. He used to be vice chairman of the China Association for Promoting Democracy Central Committee, vice chairman of the China Federation of Literary and Art Circles, chairman of the Chinese Folk Literature and Art Association, member of the Chinese People's Political Consultative Conference Standing Committee, and chairman of Tianjin Federation of Literary and Art Circles.

In 2013, Feng won the 22nd Montblanc de la Culture Arts Patronage Award.

In 2018, the China Federation of Literary and Art Circles honoured Feng and Wu Bing'an with the Lifetime Achievement Award in Folk Art and Literature.

== Translated works (English) ==
- Chrysanthemums and Other Stories (1985)
- The Miraculous Pigtail (1987)
- Voices from the Whirlwind (1991)
- Three Inch Golden Lotus (1994)
- Let One Hundred Flowers Bloom (1995)
- Ten Years of Madness: Oral Histories of China's Cultural Revolution (1996)
- Selected Stories by Feng Jicai (1999)
- Faces in the Crowd: 36 Extraordinary Tales of Tianjin (2019)
- A Looking-Glass World (2021)
- From Purgatory to Paradise: An Oral History of Artist Han Meilin from the Cultural Revolution to the Present Day (2023)
- The Enemies of Art (2024)
