= Liaoning University =

Public university in Shenyang, Liaoning, China

- 辽宁大学
- Motto: 明德精学 笃行志强(Noble in Morality, Extensive in Learning, Tenacious in Action and Independent in Spirit.)
- Type: Public
- Established: 1948; 78 years ago
- President: Yu Miaojie
- Undergraduates: 17,000
- Postgraduates: 7,100
- Location: Shenyang, Liaoning, China
- Website: enweb.lnu.edu.cn

Liaoning University (LNU; Chinese: 辽宁大学; pinyin: Liáoníng Dàxué) is a public university founded in 1948 in Shenyang, Liaoning, China. It is affiliated with the Province of Liaoning, and co-funded by the Liaoning Provincial People's Government and the Ministry of Education. The university is part of Project 211 and the Double First-Class Construction.

== Overview ==
September 1958 saw the amalgamation of the Northeast Institute of Finance and Economics, Shenyang Normal College and Shenyang Institute of Russian, which led to the birth of Liaoning University. Marshal Zhu De wrote the inscription of the school name for the university. At present, the university has an area of 143 hectares (350 acres) (including the university proper, Liaoyang Foreign Languages College and the Puhe Campus), with a building area totaling 600,000 square meters.

The university has fifteen colleges, namely: College of Liberal Arts, College of Economics, College of Business Administration, College of International Relations, Asia-Australia College of Business, College of Philosophy and Public Administration, College of Foreign Languages, College of Radio, Film and Television, College of Chemical Science and Engineering, College of Law, College of Information Science and Technology, College of Higher Professional Techniques, College of Adult Education, College of Foreign Students, and College of Training Self-Study Students of Humanities and Professional Techniques. In addition to the colleges, the university has five college-level faculties, namely: Faculty of History, Faculty of Mathematics, Faculty of Physics, Faculty of Life Science and Faculty of Environment Science. Altogether, the university has forty-three undergraduate disciplines, fifty-three master-degree-granting disciplines, including MBA and JM. The university is also invested with authority to grant doctorate of philosophy in theoretical economics (the first level discipline) and nine other doctorates (the second level discipline). Furthermore, the university has three mobile stations for post-doctoral studies to its credit, with two national key disciplines of world economy and national economy in addition to a base for cultivating personnel of basic national economy, and a key base for research on humanities, and a center of research on the system of comparative economy as designated by the Ministry of Education. The university has eleven province-level key disciplines and one test and detection center.

Liaoning University's Motto: Noble in Morality, Extensive in Learning, Tenacious in Action and Independent in Spirit

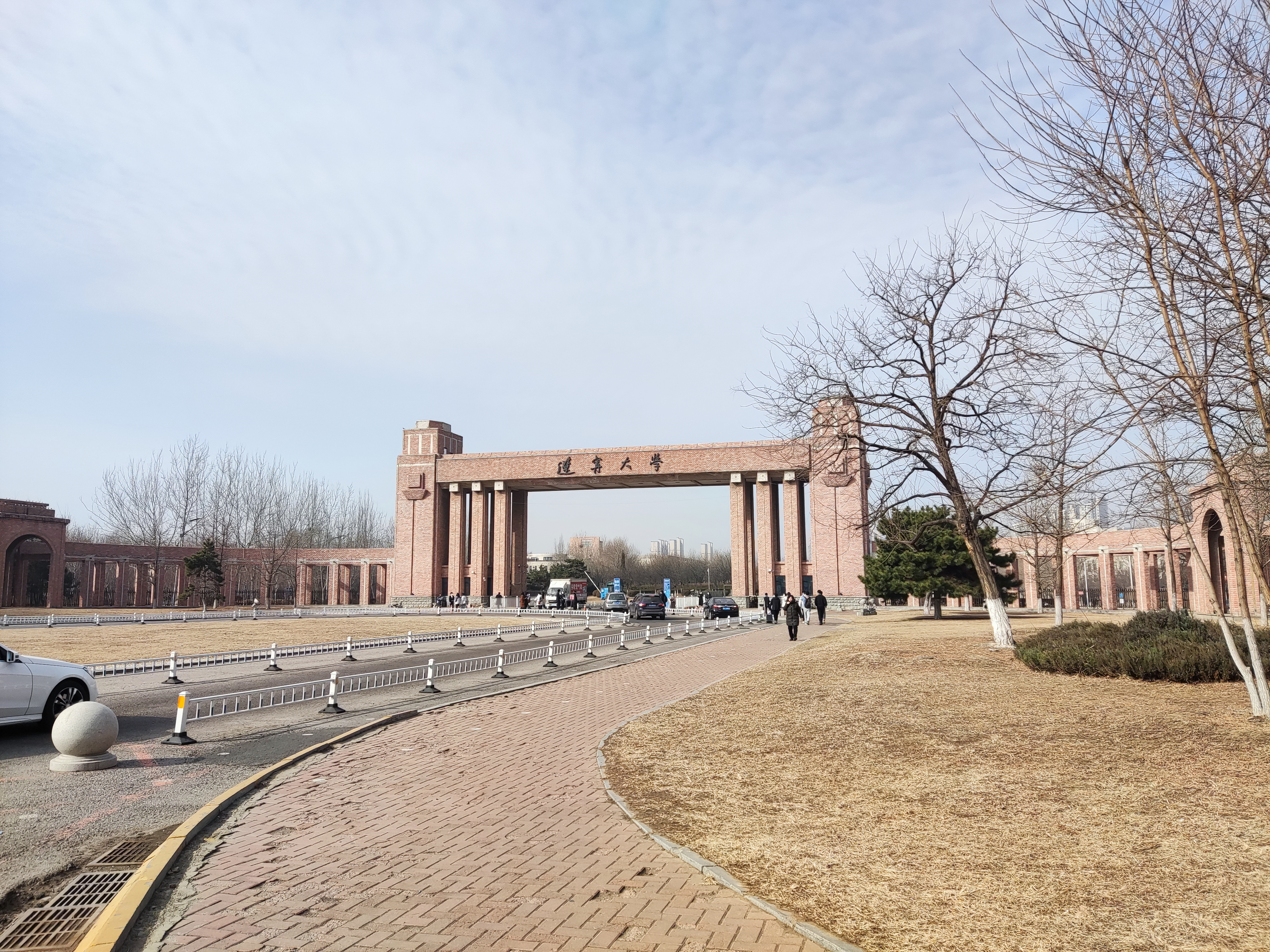
Liaoning University Gate

Liaoning University has a teaching body of 1,116 full-time faculty members, among whom there are 614 professors and associate professors. The university has 18,700 students of different kinds, ranging from undergraduates and graduate students to foreign students. Since it was founded, Liaoning University has established formal friendly relationships of academic cooperation and interflow with over forty higher schools and research institutions in fourteen countries, and has since fostered over a hundred thousand full-time students for the country and over 5,000 foreign students as well from forty-two countries including the United States, Japan, Russia, Italy, the United Kingdom, France, the Republic of Korea, and Thailand.

The university's library with its 18,500-square-meter building area, equipped with modern advanced facilities, is stocked with over 1.6 million volumes, including over 300 kinds of rare and treasured books, which are affirmed by the United Nations as the exclusive possessions of the university's library. The university also has a history museum and a museum of natural history. They have a collection of over two thousand pieces of art treasures and eleven thousand pieces of biological specimens respectively.

== Notable people ==
- Wu Bing'an, ethnologist and expert on folklore and popular culture
- Zhang Yumao, literary scholar

== See also ==
- List of universities and colleges in Liaoning
