= Bohai University =

Provincial public university in Jinzhou, Liaoning, China

- 渤海大学
- Type: Public
- Established: 2003
- Administrative staff: 1,069
- Students: 23,450
- Undergraduates: 16,700
- Postgraduates: 5,400
- Doctoral students: 1,350
- Location: Jinzhou, Liaoning, China
- Website: www.bhu.edu.cn

Bohai University (渤海大学) is a provincial public university in Jinzhou, Liaoning, China. It is affiliated with the Province of Liaoning.

In 2003, Jinzhou Teachers College and Liaoning Commercial Higher Vocational School merged to form Bohai University.

== Academics ==
Bohai University is a comprehensive educator that provides comprehensive education to undergraduate degree, graduate degree, and diploma seekers. It has 20 colleges that offer bachelor's and master's degree education in

- literature
- politics and history
- mathematics and physics
- chemistry, chemical engineering and food Safety
- college of information science and technology (software and service outsourcing)
- engineering
- economy and law
- management
- tourism
- foreign languages
- education and P.E.
- arts and communications
- international exchange (South Korea)
- Marxism
- new energy
- finance, commerce and trade
- advanced vocation and technology (maritime and applied technology)
- adult education
- training
- liberal arts and science
