= Liaoning University of Technology =

Public University in Liaoning, China

- 辽宁工业大学
- Former name: Liaoning Institute of Technology
- Type: Public
- Established: 1951
- Administrative staff: 780
- Students: 14,578
- Undergraduates: 14,000
- Postgraduates: 578
- Location: Jinzhou, Liaoning, China
- Colors: Blue and yellow
- Website: www.lnit.edu.cn

Liaoning University of Technology (Chinese: 辽宁工业大学; pinyin: Liáoníng Gōngyè Dàxué), formerly Liaoning Institute of Technology, is a university in Jinzhou, Liaoning province, northeast China.

Founded in 1951, Liaoning University of Technology is a provincial university of higher learning, specializing in engineering, but also offering instruction in science, liberal arts, economics, and management studies. It currently has over 14,000 undergraduates and 578 postgraduates, in 20 colleges and faculties teaching 38 undergraduate and 20 post-graduate specialities. The university employs 1,278 staff, including 780 full-time teachers.

The university has exchange programs with more than 20 foreign universities, administered by its School of International Education.
