= Jinzhou =

Jinzhou 锦州市 Chinchow
- Prefecture-level city
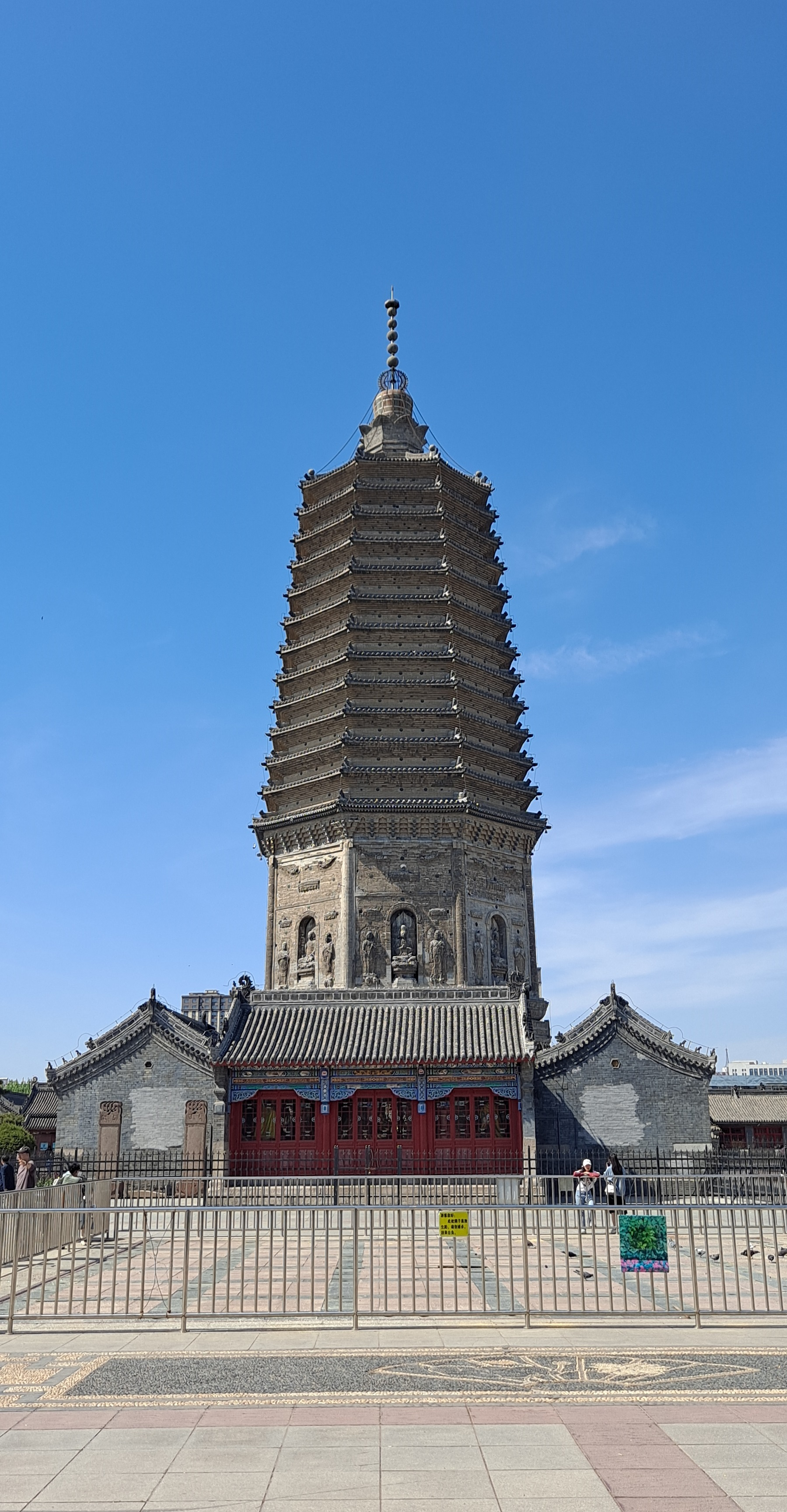
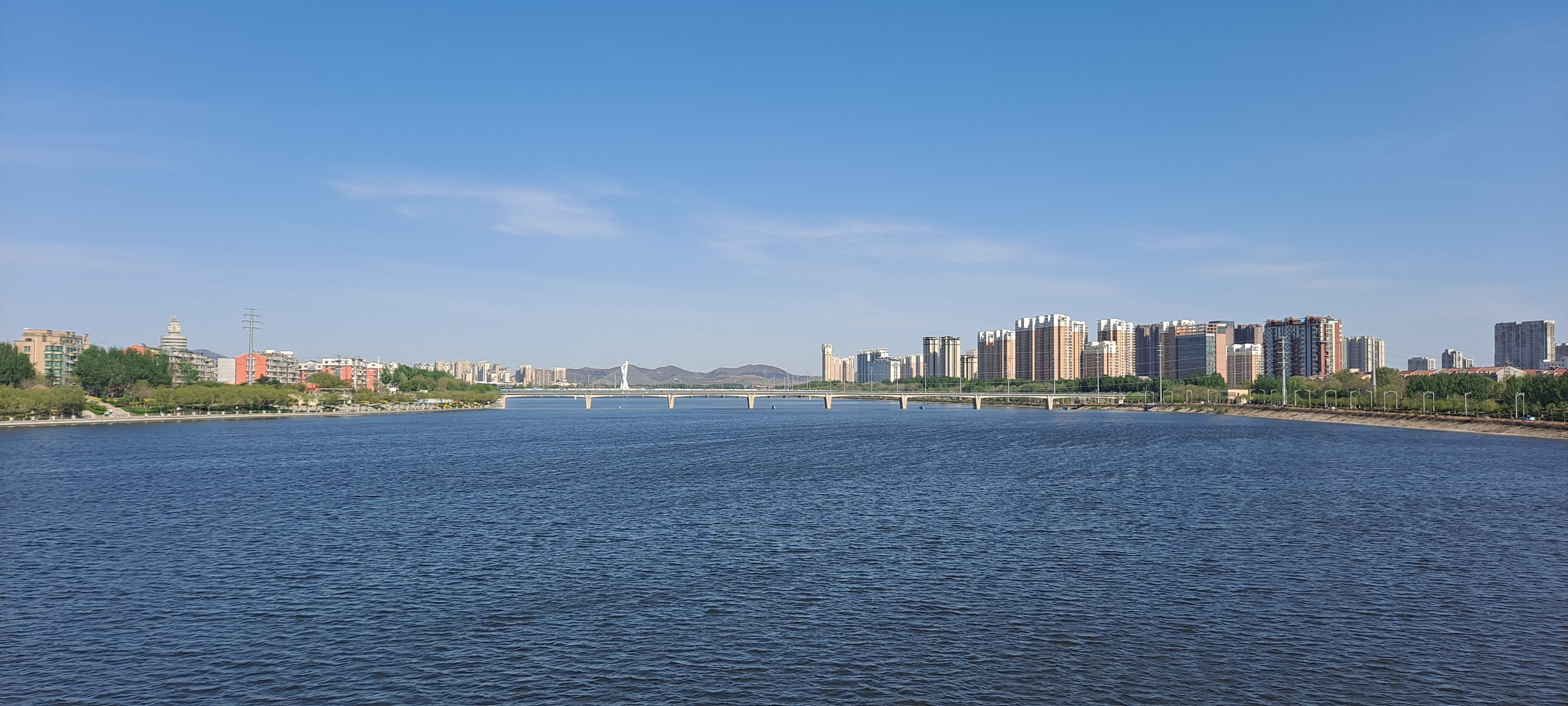
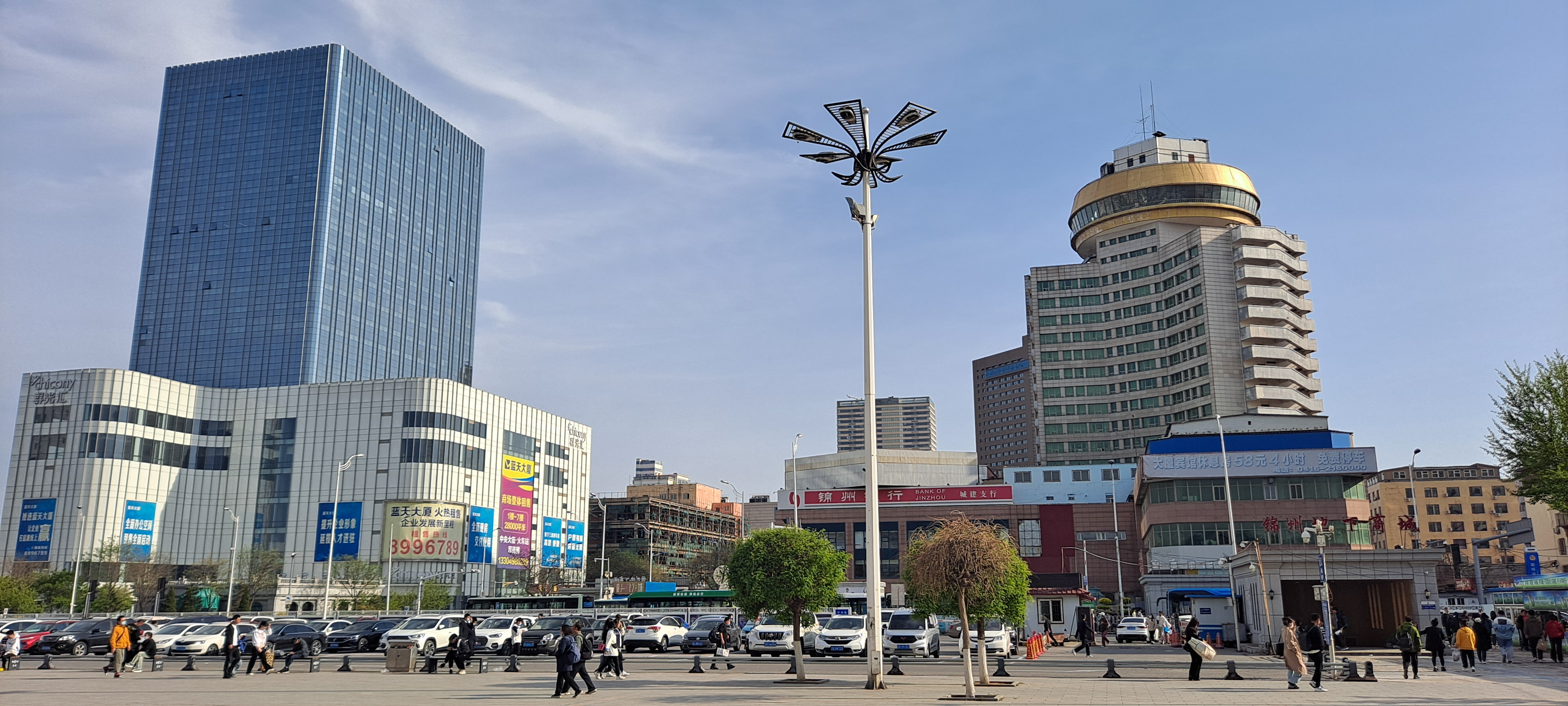
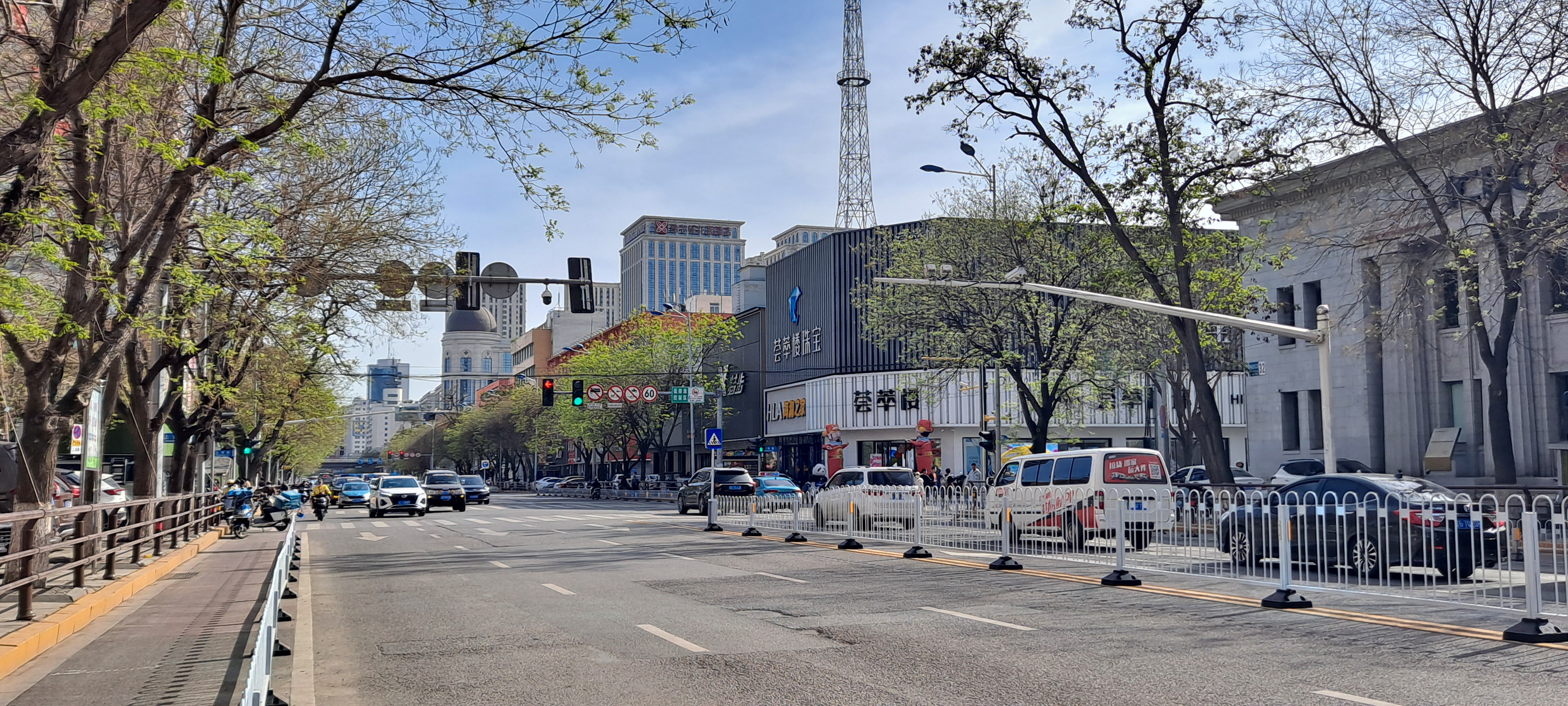

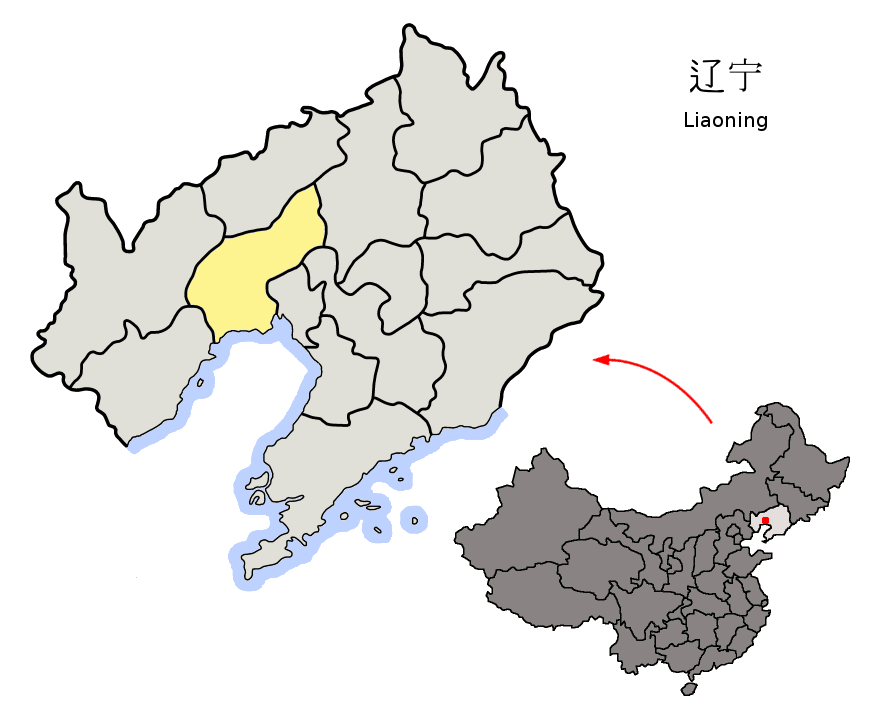
- Location of Jinzhou City jurisdiction in Liaoning

- Location of the city center in Liaoning
- Coordinates (Liaoshen campaign memorial): 41°07′44″N 121°08′53″E
- Country: People's Republic of China
- Province: Liaoning
- Districts and Counties: List: Taihe District; Guta District; Linghe District; Linghai City; Beizhen City; Heishan County; Yi County

Government
  - CPC Party Secretary: Liu Zhiqiang (刘志强)
  - Mayor: Wang Wenquan (王文权)

Area <
  - Prefecture-level city: 9,988.6 km^{2} (3,856.6 sq mi)
  - Urban: 535 km^{2} (207 sq mi)
  - Metro: 3,323.6 km^{2} (1,283.2 sq mi)
- Elevation: 24 m (79 ft)

Population (2020 census)
  - Prefecture-level city: 2,703,853
  - Density: 270.69/km^{2} (701.09/sq mi)
  - Urban: 1,111,849
  - Urban density: 2,080/km^{2} (5,380/sq mi)
  - Metro: 1,524,362
  - Metro density: 458.65/km^{2} (1,187.9/sq mi)

GDP
  - Prefecture-level city: CN¥ 132.7 billion US$ 21.3 billion
  - Per capita: CN¥ 43,207; US$ 6,937
- Time zone: UTC+8 (China Standard)
- Postcode: 121000
- Area code: 416
- ISO 3166 code: CN-LN-07
- License plate: 辽G
- Administrative division code: 210700
- Website: www.jz.gov.cn

Jinzhou (/ˈdʒɪnˈdʒoʊ/, simplified Chinese: 锦州; traditional Chinese: 錦州; pinyin: Jǐnzhōu), formerly Chinchow, is a coastal prefecture-level city in central-west Liaoning province, China. It is a geographically strategic city located in the Liaoxi Corridor, which connects most of the land transports between North China and Northeast China, and is the economic center of western Liaoning. Located on the northern shore of Liaodong Bay, Jinzhou encompasses a coastline of 97.7 km (60.7 mi), with the Port of Jinzhou being China's northernmost seaport.

It is the fifth-most populous city in Liaoning, with a population of 2,703,853 (2020 census), of whom 1,524,362 reside in the built-up (or metro) area encompassing the 3 urban urban districts and Linghai City largely being conurbated. The total area under the jurisdiction of Jinzhou is 9,989 square kilometers (3,857 sq mi), most of which is rural.

== History ==
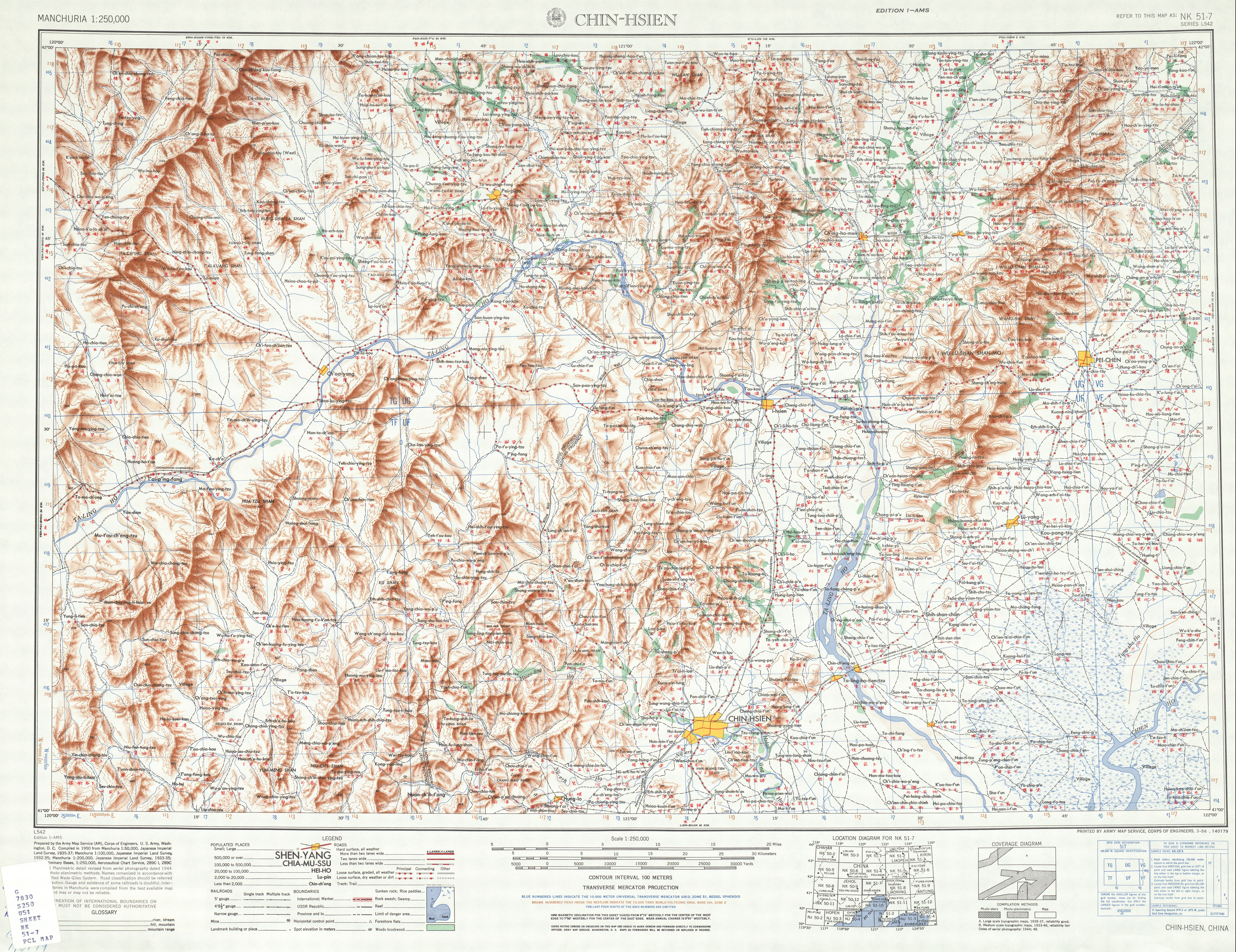
Map including Jinzhou (labeled as CHIN-HSIEN 錦縣) (AMS, 1950)

Jinzhou is an ancient city with over a thousand years of history. Originally known as Tuhe (徒河), it was part of Yan in the Warring States period. Under the Qin dynasty, the majority of what is now Jinzhou became part of Liaodong Commandery. It was part of Changli Commandery in the province of Youzhou during the Han dynasty and Three Kingdoms periods, but fell under the jurisdiction of Yingzhou in the Beiwei, Dongwei, and Beiqi periods, before becoming part of Liucheng Commandery and then Yan Prefecture during the Sui dynasty and Tang dynasty. During the Tang, it was the seat of the Andong Protectorate.

The name "Jinzhou" came into use in the Liao dynasty, when it belonged to Zhongjing prefecture. In the Jin dynasty, it was part of Dongjing Prefecture and Beijing Prefecture. It belonged to Liaoyang Xingzhongshu in the Mongol Empire/Yuan dynasty and to Liaodong township in the Ming dynasty. It was ruled by Tianfu during the Qing dynasty, when its name was changed from Jinzhou to Jinxian. It is also known in English as Chinhsien and Chinchow.

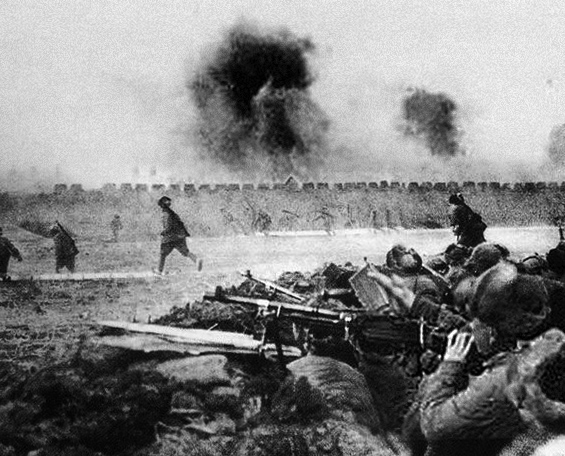
People's Liberation Army launches final strike on Jinzhou

During the Republican period, Jinzhou was attached to Liaoning Province. When the Chinese Civil War resumed in 1945, Jinzhou was the site of a major battle between the Communist and Nationalist forces, since it is where the main route from Manchuria through Shanhai Pass enters central China. Its capture on 22 November 1945, by Nationalist forces under Du Yuming forced the Communists to agree to a temporary ceasefire that lasted several months.

During the Liaoshen campaign, in which the People's Liberation Army began to consolidate control of Northeast China, refugees tried to escape to the city to flee further south. The Republic of China Army, under orders from Chiang Kai-shek not to allow refugees to escape the region, shot at them as they tried to cross the Daling River 30 kilometers north of the city. The Communists commanded by Lin Biao captured the city in September 1948.

After the establishment of the People's Republic of China in 1949, Liaoxi Province was founded and Jinzhou became its provincial capital. Jinzhou came back under the administration of Liaoning Province in 1954, when Liaoxi and Liaodong provinces re-merged.

== Geography and climate ==
Jinzhou is located in the southwestern portion of Liaoning, and borders Panjin, Anshan, and Shenyang to the east, and Huludao on the west. The city's southern coast is the Liaodong Bay. On the north are Chaoyang and Fuxin.

Jinzhou has a monsoon-influenced humid continental climate (Köppen Dwa), with four distinct seasons; winters are cold but very dry while summers are hot and humid. The monthly 24-hour average temperature ranges from −7.9 °C (17.8 °F) to 24.3 °C (75.7 °F) in July, with the annual mean being 9.50 °C (49.1 °F). The annual average precipitation is between 540 and 640 millimeters (21 and 25 in), the majority of which usually occurs in July and August alone. With monthly percent possible sunshine ranging from 45% in July to 68% in three months, the city receives 2,682 hours of bright sunshine annually, with autumn and winter being especially sunny.

Fossil-bearing rocks are exposed in the city's vicinity, including the Yixian Formation. A genus of Early Cretaceous birds has been named Jinzhouornis in honor of the locality, but it appears to be a junior synonym of Confuciusornis which was found in the same formation some years earlier.

Climate data for Jinzhou, elevation 66 m (217 ft), (1991–2020 normals, extremes 1939–present)
Month	Jan	Feb	Mar	Apr	May	Jun	Jul	Aug	Sep	Oct	Nov	Dec	Year
Record high °C (°F)	12.3 (54.1)	18.6 (65.5)	28.2 (82.8)	36.1 (97.0)	37.3 (99.1)	41.8 (107.2)	41.7 (107.1)	37.9 (100.2)	34.9 (94.8)	29.3 (84.7)	22.2 (72.0)	13.9 (57.0)	41.8 (107.2)
Mean daily maximum °C (°F)	−1.6 (29.1)	2.5 (36.5)	9.2 (48.6)	17.4 (63.3)	24.1 (75.4)	27.2 (81.0)	29.4 (84.9)	29.2 (84.6)	25.4 (77.7)	17.9 (64.2)	7.7 (45.9)	0.3 (32.5)	15.7 (60.3)
Daily mean °C (°F)	−7.1 (19.2)	−3.2 (26.2)	3.3 (37.9)	11.5 (52.7)	18.3 (64.9)	22.3 (72.1)	25.2 (77.4)	24.6 (76.3)	19.8 (67.6)	12.0 (53.6)	2.4 (36.3)	−4.9 (23.2)	10.4 (50.6)
Mean daily minimum °C (°F)	−11.3 (11.7)	−7.7 (18.1)	−1.5 (29.3)	6.3 (43.3)	13.1 (55.6)	18.1 (64.6)	21.7 (71.1)	20.7 (69.3)	14.8 (58.6)	7.0 (44.6)	−2.0 (28.4)	−9.0 (15.8)	5.9 (42.5)
Record low °C (°F)	−24.8 (−12.6)	−22.8 (−9.0)	−19.3 (−2.7)	−7.8 (18.0)	1.5 (34.7)	8.9 (48.0)	13.2 (55.8)	8.2 (46.8)	2.3 (36.1)	−6.2 (20.8)	−17.8 (0.0)	−23.9 (−11.0)	−24.8 (−12.6)
Average precipitation mm (inches)	2.5 (0.10)	3.0 (0.12)	7.3 (0.29)	23.8 (0.94)	52.4 (2.06)	94.4 (3.72)	145.3 (5.72)	140.9 (5.55)	40.5 (1.59)	29.4 (1.16)	13.7 (0.54)	3.0 (0.12)	556.2 (21.91)
Average precipitation days (≥ 0.1 mm)	1.8	1.7	2.4	5.0	7.3	10.9	10.8	9.3	5.9	4.9	3.2	1.5	64.7
Average snowy days	2.8	2.8	2.3	1.0	0	0	0	0	0	0.3	2.6	3.0	14.8
Average relative humidity (%)	49	47	44	45	51	66	75	73	63	55	52	51	56
Mean monthly sunshine hours	205.1	209.8	249.8	249.7	274.5	231.3	207.9	230.6	241.7	226.0	188.4	188.7	2,703.5
Percentage possible sunshine	69	69	67	62	61	51	46	55	65	67	64	66	62
Source 1: China Meteorological Administrationall-time August temperatureOctober all-time Record
Source 2: Weather China

== Administration ==
Jinzhou has eight immediate sub-municipal divisions:

Map
#	Name	Chinese	Hanyu Pinyin	Population (2003 est.)	Area (km^{2})	Density (/km^{2})
1	Taihe District	太和区	Tàihé Qū	210,000	459	458
2	Guta District	古塔区	Gǔtǎ Qū	240,000	28	8,571
3	Linghe District	凌河区	Línghé Qū	420,000	48	8,750
4	Linghai City	凌海市	Línghǎi Shì	600,000	2,862	210
5	Beizhen City	北镇市	Běizhèn Shì	530,000	1,782	297
6	Heishan County	黑山县	Hēishān Xiàn	630,000	2,436	259
7	Yi County	义县	Yì Xiàn	440,000	2,496	176
8	Jinzhou Economic and Technical Development Zone	锦州经济 技术开发区	Jǐnzhōu Jīngjì; Jìshù Kāifā Qū			

The above eight are subdivided into 43 towns, 69 townships, and 1680 villages.

== Economy ==
Jinzhou has a wide range of industries. Major traditional industries include petrochemistry, metallurgy, textiles, pharmacy and building materials.

Jinzhou Economic and Technical Development Zone: The Jinzhou Economic and Technical Development Zone was established in 1992. It is among the first province-level development zones approved by Liaoning Province. The development zone enjoys convenient transportation with easy access to Jinzhou Seaport, Jinzhou airport and several state highways.

Shopping and Services: Within the city, some western franchises have set up shop, most notably KFC, which has a long established foothold in Chinese markets. RT-Mart, New-Mart and Do-Do Express are major food and sundries retailers. Bank of Jinzhou (Jinzhou Yinhang) is the only bank in Jinzhou upon this writing with native English speaking staff, while Western Union, Bank of China and many other banking service are also present in the city. Visa and MasterCard are not accepted in Jinzhou, aside from a few large bank branches with access to these networks.

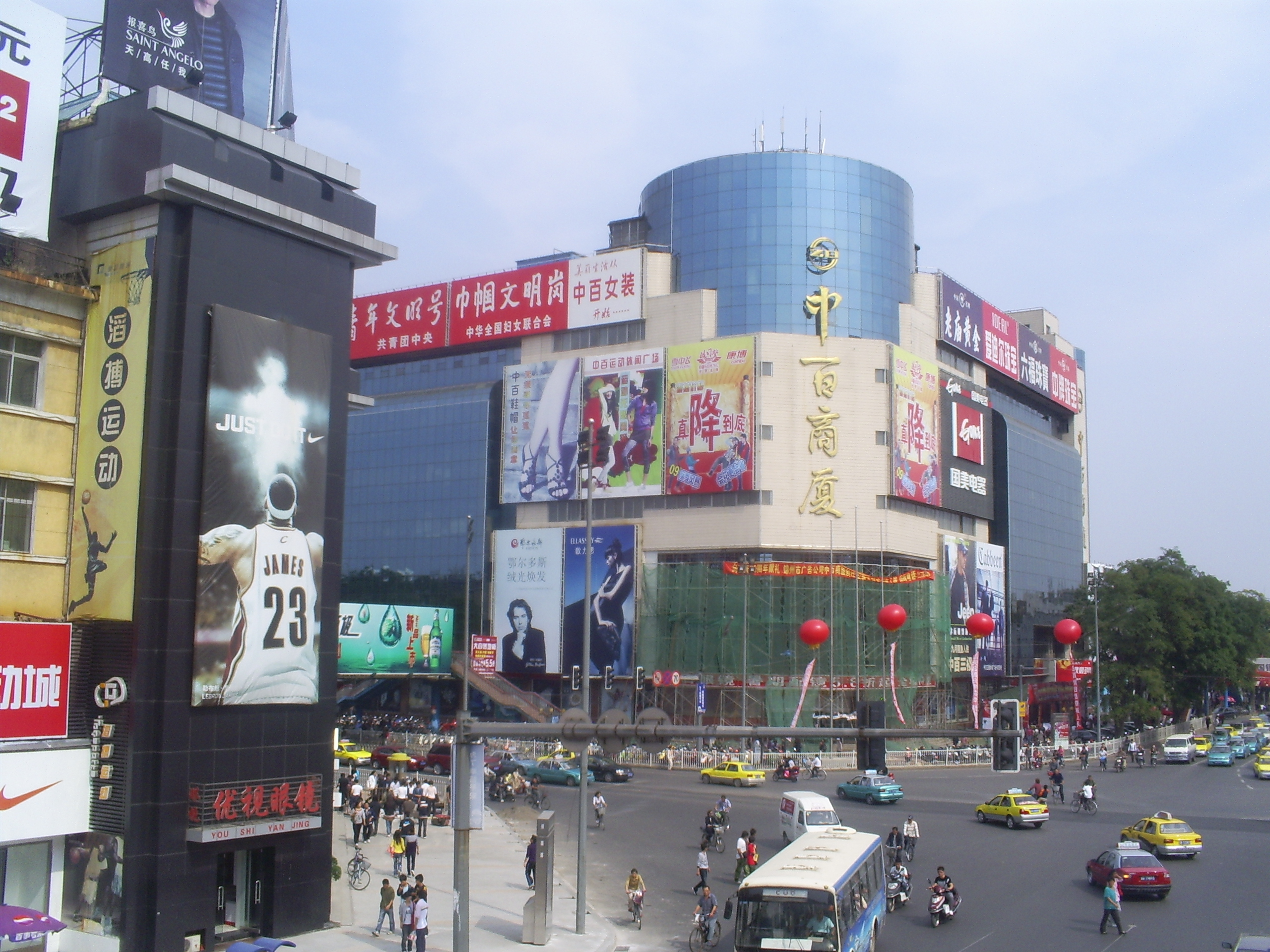
Photograph of a shopping mall in Jinzhou city.

== Transport ==
Jinzhou Jinzhouwan Airport provides air transport to major airports in China. There are two railway stations in the city, one designated for long trips and one for shorter routes. The most popular way to get around Jinzhou is on foot or by bicycle. Taxis crowd the streets and start at 6 RMB per trip. Bus routes also blanket the city and provide the most economical means of transportation, but are not always reliable.

== Military ==
Jinzhou is headquarters of the 40th Group Army of the People's Liberation Army, one of the three group armies that comprise the Shenyang Military Region responsible for defending China's northeastern borders with Russia and North Korea.

== Tourism ==
The Liaoshen Campaign Memorial (traditional Chinese: 遼沈戰役紀念館; simplified Chinese: 辽沈战役纪念馆) commemorates the Liaoshen Campaign of 1948. It is a large museum that holds and displays over 16,000 pieces of equipment used during the campaign, including rifles, machine guns, mortars, cannons, and tanks. It also holds thousands of pictures and documents. The best known exhibit inside the museum is the Panoramic Picture Hall, which reproduces the complete Battle of Jinzhou on a rotating circular screen.

Yiwulü Mountain is located in the west of Beizhen City of Jinzhou. It is one of the three sacred mountains in Northeast China. Wanghai Mountain is the main peak, with a height of 867 meters above the sea level, and tourist spots such as Beizhen Temple, Shenshui Bridge, Fish Pool, Guanyin Pavilion, Sijiao Pavilion, Kuangguang Pavilion, Lotus Stone, Cloud Pass and Wanghai Temple are scattered throughout the mountain range.

Mount Bijia is an island in the Bohai Sea south of Jinzhou and the site of a Chinese Buddhist temple. During most of the day, Mount Bijia can only be accessed by boat, but when the tide wanes, a natural causeway connects Mount Bijia to the mainland. People can walk to Mount Bijia from the seafront on foot and local people have named this natural wonder Tian Qiao, (lit: Sky Bridge). On the top of the mountain there is a tall stone pavilion, which resembles a gigantic pen resting on a pen holder, hence the name "Bijiashan", meaning the "Pen Holder Mountain".

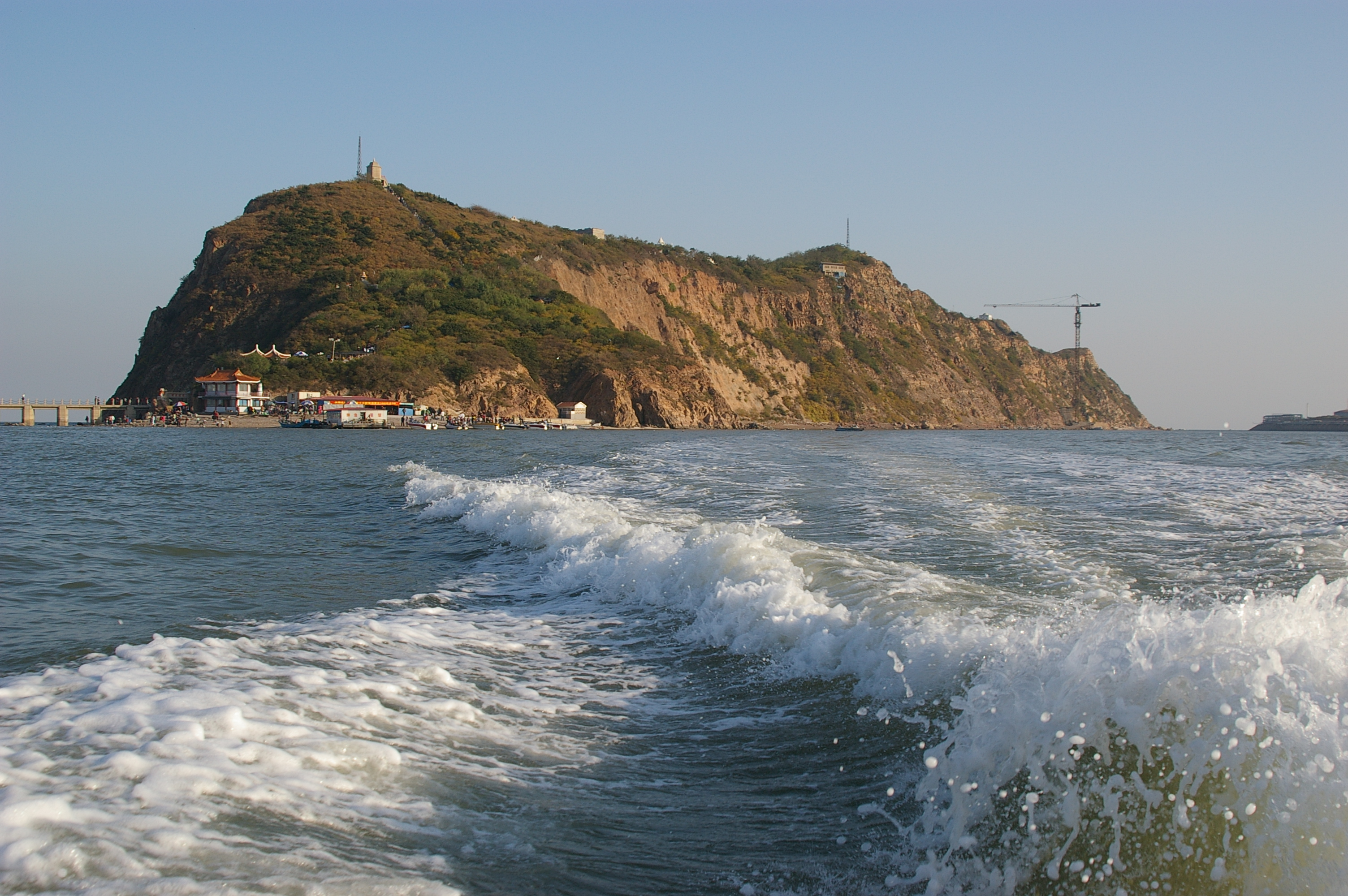
Photograph of Mount Bijia at high tide.

Guangji Pagoda (traditional Chinese: 廣濟寺塔; simplified Chinese: 广济寺塔): The Guangji Pagoda is located in Guta Park situated at the heart of Jinzhou. The 72-meter-tall tower is an example of beautiful Liao-style architecture, with thirteen levels in an octagonal shape. A quiet temple beneath completes the ancient Chinese setting. Visitors will see locals gather for early morning rituals, exercise and various other activities. There is no fee for admission to the temple grounds.

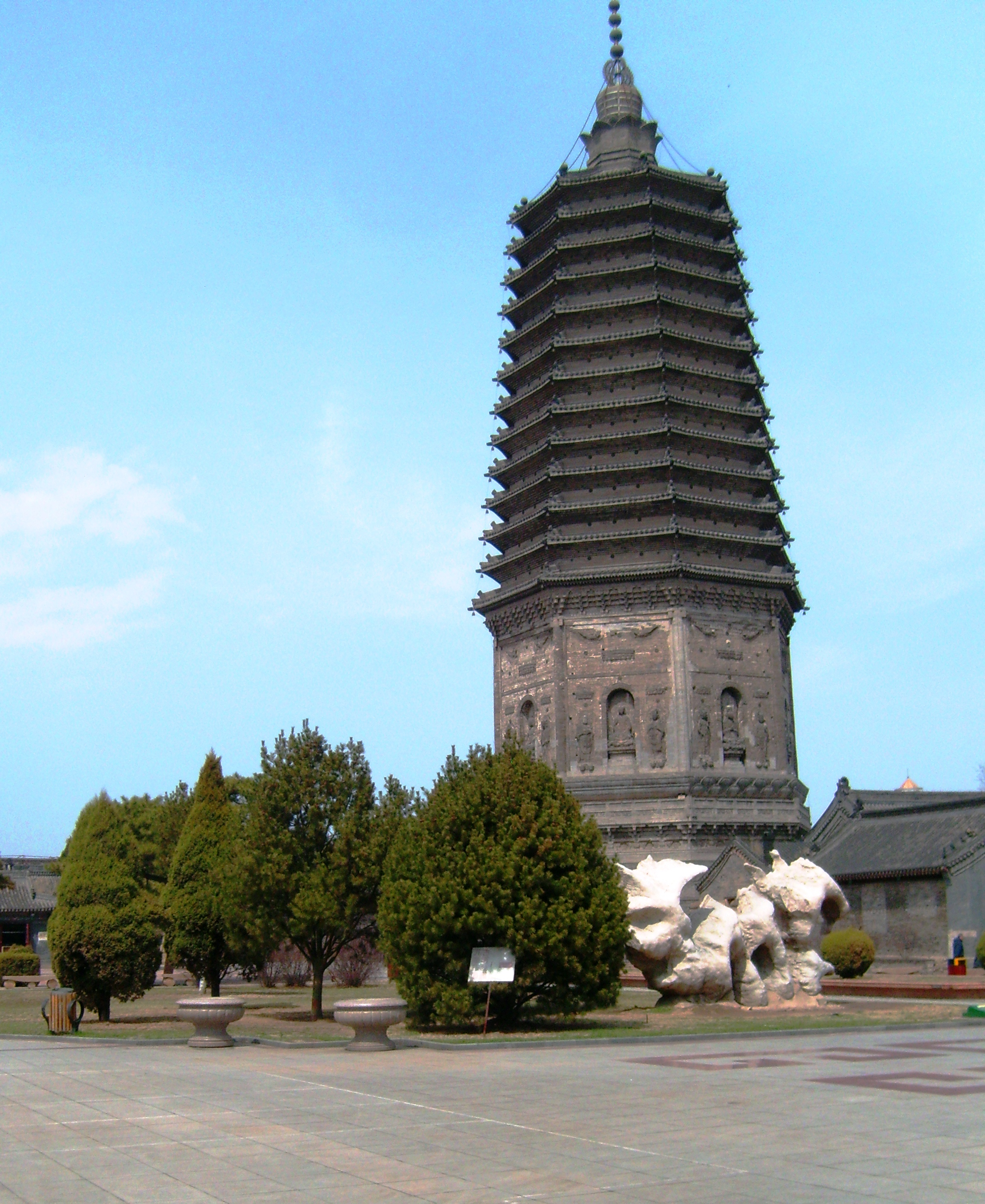
Guangji Pagoda

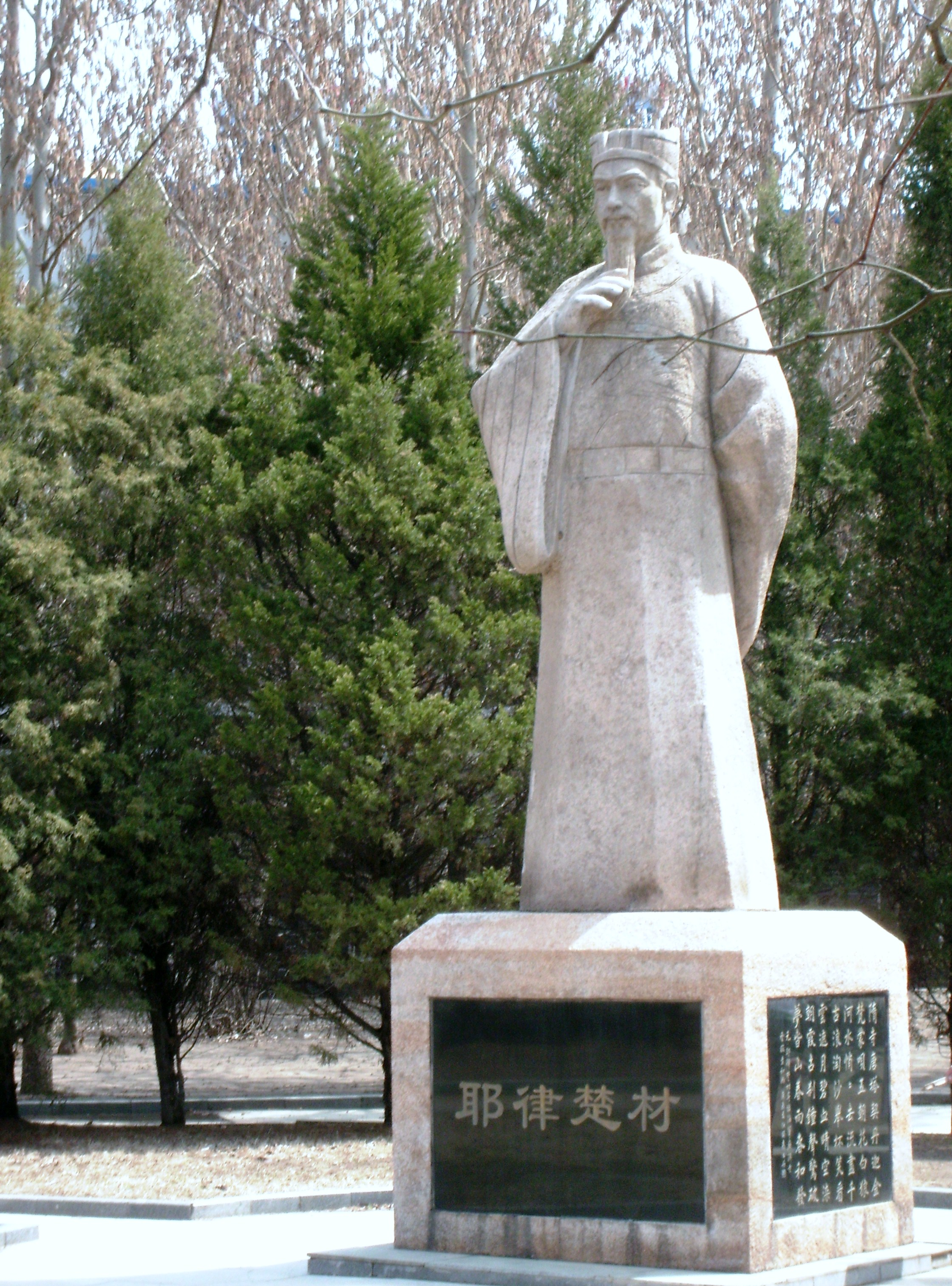
The statue of Yelü Chucai, an ancient Chinese philosopher, located in the southeast corner of Guta Park.

During the winter, a small ice park on the Xiaoling River is set up, and lasts as long as the river is frozen. Activities include, riding ATVs on the frozen river, ice skating, ice skating chairs and vehicles, and rubber tyre rides, while being pulled by vehicles.

Jinzhou is currently most famous for its Night Market which usually runs during summer evenings and becomes the Morning Market during the colder seasons. One can enjoy many snacks, drinks, partake in various activities and be part of the bustling atmosphere. The Jinzhou Night Market is located on Nanning Street （南宁路）

== Culture ==
One of the bestselling nonfiction novels of the 1990s, "Wild Swans: Three Daughters of China", provides some detailed descriptions of Jinzhou both before and after the "1949 Liberation of China".

== Notable people ==
- Wang Lijun, municipal police chief. His dependability became known to Bo Xilai during his stint as Liaoning governor from 2000 to 2004. When Bo was promoted to Party Secretary of Chongqing in 2008 and found the huge corruption-pyramid fostered under Wang Yang (whose secretaryship had been moved to Guangdong), he called on Wang Lijun to take over this new municipal police force and use what he could of it to execute a crackdown, which led to the 2009 Chongqing Triad scandal.
- 2010 Nobel Peace Prize Winner Liu Xiaobo was incarcerated at a prison in Jinzhou, although he is originally from Changchun, Jilin.
- Chinese fashion designer Momo Wang was born and raised in Jinzhou.
- Zhang Xiaoguang, Chinese taikonaut.
- Zhang Ning, Chinese female badminton player and 2-time olympic champion.

== Colleges and Universities ==
- Liaoning University of Technology
- Bohai University
- Liaoning Medical University

== Sister cities ==
Jinzhou has one sister city, as designated by Sister Cities International.

- Arvada, Colorado, United States
