= Jinzhou Medical University =

Public Medical School in Jinzhou, China

Jinzhou Medical University (Chinese: 锦州医科大学; pinyin: Jǐnzhōu yīkē dàxué) is a university located in Jinzhou city, Liaoning province, north eastern China.

Founded in 1946, the school developed in to Jinzhou Medical College in 1958 and Liaoning Medical University in 2006. JZMU took its current name in 2016. The campus covers 1,140,000 square meters and lies in the north of the city. There are 16 teaching departments, 98 teaching offices, 56 teaching laboratories, 4 affiliated comprehensive hospitals and 169 bases for teaching and practice.

The university's curriculum comprises 21 specialized undergraduate subjects, 32 master's degree programs and 1 doctor degree program. Six kinds of education are offered in JZMU: general high education, state-owned privately run education, adult education, vocational education, online education and international students' education.

Among the faculty members, there are 823 full-time teachers, 74 of whom have been granted a doctoral degree, 533 associate professors and 219 professors and chief doctors. The university's library has an advanced electronic reading room and has access to the retrieval system for medical documents from the American MEDLINE and the Chinese Medical Institute.

The university enrolls undergraduate, graduate and master as well as postgraduate students. The total number of students has amounted to 13,806 including international students, all of whom are currently studying in the undergraduate program taught in English. Presently, there are more than 400 international students studying a wide range of medical programs at the university. Furthermore, the university is actively involved in international academic exchange activities with universities abroad, such as the University of Glasgow and regularly exchanges scholars and specialists to give lectures. About 120 teachers have been sent to more than 20 countries to study and involve in research.

== College of International Education ==
The College of International Education (CIE) was established in April 2004 as a part of the International Exchange Department (IED) of Liaoning Medical University.

IED is a functional organization responsible for academic work related to foreign affairs. It is designated to carry out the national foreign policies and educational policies. Its function is to strictly follow the foreign policies and the rules of foreign affairs management. In practice, IED takes care of the managing, guiding, coordinating, and providing services for all the foreign-related work in Liaoning Medical University.

The IED consists of the Educational Administrative Office and the Dormitory Administrative Office. The College of International Education is a parallel college to the IED with the same staff. CIE is one of the youngest but the most vigorous departments in Liaoning Medical University. It has been putting a lot of effort in recruiting medical students with multiple educational backgrounds. CIE provides medical courses for international medical graduates and at the same time offers the possibility for international students to get a better understanding of Chinese society and culture.
