= Shenyang Institute of Engineering =

Provincial public college in Shenyang, Liaoning, China

Shenyang Engineering Institute (Chinese: 沈阳工程学院; pinyin: Shěnyáng Gōngchéng Xuéyuàn) is a provincial public college in Shenyang, Liaoning, China. It is affiliated with the Province of Liaoning, and sponsored by the provincial government.

The institute occupies an area of 920,000 square meters, and a construction area of 270,000 square meters.
