= Shenyang University =

University in Shenyang, China

Coordinates: 41.8256°N 123.4600°E

Shenyang University (Chinese: 沈阳大学; pinyin: Shěnyáng Dàxué) is a university in Shenyang, Liaoning, China under the provincial government. It has a student body of more than 30,000 students and has about 1260 full-time teachers.

== Academics ==
The university contains 21 colleges, 1 PhD program and 10 master's programs. It offers 56 undergraduate majors. Shenyang University includes colleges of material sciences, engineering, foreign languages, and international economics.

== Enrollment ==
Presently, approximately 30,000 students are enrolled at the university. Students come from primarily Liaoning Province, but others come from provinces across China.

== Campuses ==
Shenyang University's iconic library

Shenyang University encompasses 572,000 square meters with 402,000 square meters of buildings. It consists of these four campuses:

- The Main Campus located in Shenyang City's Dadong District. The main campus is divided into the north campus and south campus. The campuses are connected by a 215-meter (0.13 mile) footbridge extending over a canal and train tracks. The main gate of the north campus is on Wanghua South Street. The main gate of the south campus is on Lianhe Rd.
- The Shenyang University Institute of Science and Technology, sometimes called Green Island (Chinese: 绿岛; pinyin: Lǜ dǎo)
- The Wen Cui Lu Campus
- Xinmin Normal College

== Libraries ==
One of the school's libraries occupies the northern part of the school's main campus, southwest of the north gate. It occupies 22,600 square meters and houses a collection of about 1,447,000 books. The library's design is the result of an architecture competition. The winning entry was submitted by both APS Architects of Singapore and Shenyang Aluminium Design Research Institute.

== The Shenyang University Institute of Science and Technology ==
The Shenyang University Institute of Science and Technology (Chinese: 沈阳大学科技工程学院概况; pinyin: Shěnyáng dàxué kējì gōngchéng xuéyuàn gàikuàng) was founded in 2001. The institute serves 5600 full-time students and offers undergraduate degrees in 35 majors. Since 2009, it occupies Green Island Forrest Park, a 694,300-square-meter campus which was formerly Shenyang's first five-star hotel. The campus houses multimedia-enable classrooms, a library, laboratories, an indoor swimming pool, fitness center, and dining center. It has more than 300 full-time teachers.

== Xinmin Normal College ==
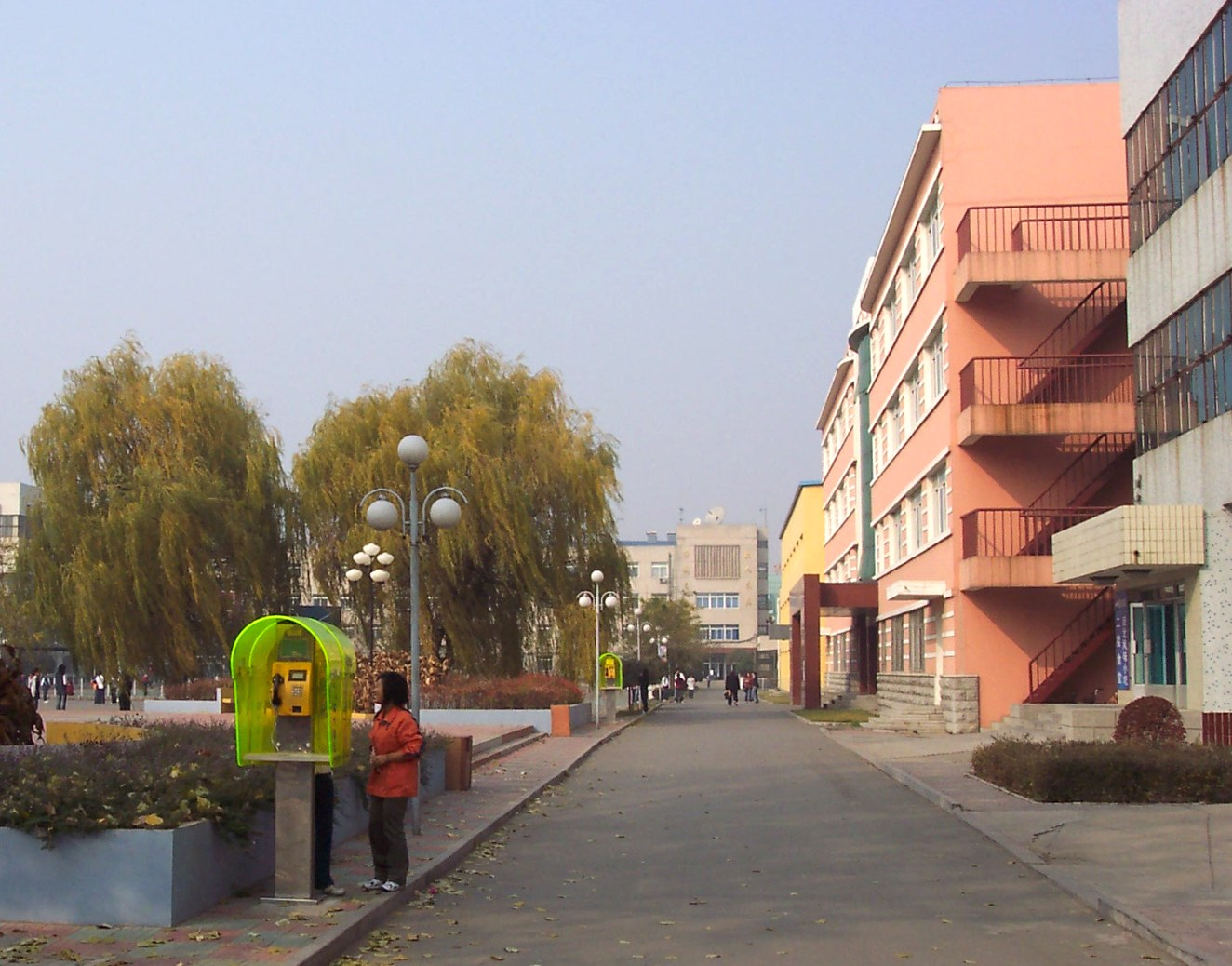
The campus of Xinmin Normal College in autumn

Xinmin Normal College (Chinese: 新民师范学院; pinyin: Xīnmín shīfàn xuéyuàn) is a school for the education of students who will be teachers. Once separate from Shenyang University, the Shenyang Municipal Committee decided to incorporate the college into Shenyang University. Xinmin Normal College was established in 1906 and is older than the university itself. The school has more than 2,000 students and the campus is 94,000 square meters large with 44,000 square meters of buildings.
