= Shenyang Ligong University =

University in Shenyang, China

Coordinates: 41.7260°N 123.4870°E

- 沈阳理工大学
- Motto: 弘志励学 德才并蓄
- Established: 1948
- Academic staff: 2,000
- Undergraduates: 28,000
- Postgraduates: 1,000
- Location: Shenyang, Liaoning, China
- Campus: College town
- Website: www.sylu.edu.cn/sylusite

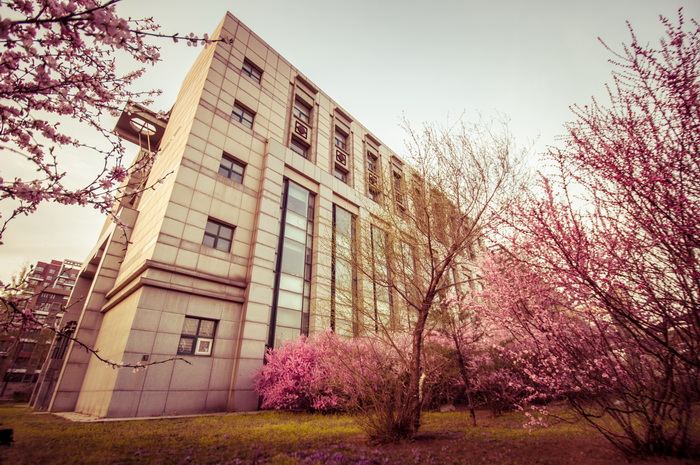
Campus in spring

Shenyang Ligong University (SYLU) is a university in Shenyang, Liaoning, China under the provincial government. Its campus is in a new district of Hunnan New District.

== History ==
Over 65 years of construction and development, Shenyang Ligong University developed from a single-discipline military and technological school into a multi-disciplinary university, well-known in engineering, with combinations of spheres of science, management, arts, economics, law and art. With the distinctive features of national defense, SLU enrolls students on a nationwide basis, mainly contributing to the development of Liaoning Province.

SLU has established stable cooperation with 65 universities in 11 countries, such as Russia, the United States, Britain, Canada, Germany, Japan, Finland, etc. Four advanced laboratories were built with nine institutes from the National Academy of Sciences of Russia and Belarus. SLU has conducted joint programs with universities in the United Kingdom, the United States, Canada, Russia, and other countries. Confucius Institute has been established based on the cooperation with Tomsk State University in Russia, meanwhile, the cooperation between the two universities is extended with the opening of the Pushkin Russian Language Center, which was approved by the Ministry of Education of China as a national Russian center.

With full enthusiasm, innovative and enterprising spirit, SLU is striving to be a high-level teaching-research university, with distinctive features, domestically well-known, and distinguished first-echelon university in Liaoning Province.

== Academics ==
Shenyang Ligong University has owned one national Sino-Russian Scientific and Technological Cooperation Base, six provincial engineering research centers, three provincial innovation teams. In the past five years, the university has undertaken 1,760 scientific research projects, among which 146 projects are national level, including 19 projects of the 973 or 863 programs and 26 projects of National Natural Science Foundation. The university has received one national award and 30 provincial awards. The number of published research papers totaled up to 3,874, including 1,215 papers with SCI, EI and ISTP index. 288 books have been published. 444 patents have been authorized, of which 44 are invention patents. The university has tremendous research strength in machinery manufacturing, energy and environment protection, electronic information, automatic control, new materials production.

Research focuses on the following fields:

- Machinery Manufacturing: FMS technology, automatic assembly and detection, numerical control machine tool and numerical control machining, industrial robot, ultra-precision machining, special machining and high-speed cutting, milling-cutting combined machining, detection and control of machining process, structure and functional design of automobiles and motorcycles, fault diagnosis technology, dynamic balance technology, mode design and manufacturing technology, CAD & CAM application.
- Energy and Environment Protection: Development of energy-saving radiation non-pressure crude oil heater, Microprocessor-controlled sprinkling system for agricultural irrigation, Sulfur-fixed coal produced with household garbage, Energy-saving speed control with frequency-conversion, Engineering design for environment protection and management, Technique and equipment for comprehensive treatment and analysis & monitoring of water and smoke pollution, Treatment process of heavy metal waste water.
- Electronic and Information Industry: Code bar technology, Magnetic card production, IC cards production, R & D of intelligent detection equipment, Application of infrared detection, Theoretical research of anti-interference and stability of detection system, Computer control system, Theoretical research and application of discrete event dynamic system, Speed regulating system, Electronic device, Computer network and development of software and hardware.
- New Material and Chemical Engineering: Composition of cementing compound and sealant application of adhesive technology, Preparation of energy-saving building materials, Properties and preparation of composite materials, Performance test of foundry plaster and aluminum alloy, Research of brightness of aluminum alloy handrails of estate car, Process and material of piston of car air-conditioner, Die-casting of aluminum alloy with high strength, Materials of aluminum alloy, New material of cast iron used in car brake, Material and manufacturing process of engine cover, R&D of industrial lubricants.
- Casting Technique and Equipment: Ultrasonic casting technology, Sand reclamation technology, Die-casting technique of large and intricate thin-wall working units, Design of expert system for blanking die, Argon refine device, Numerical simulation of casting, Technology for improving solid mold of diesel engine, Casting engineering (CAD/CAE/CAPP/ES).
- Management Engineering: CI design for enterprise, Assets evaluation, Enterprise development strategy, Sustainable development of city and enterprise, Establishment of modern enterprise system for state-owned medium and large scale enterprises, Innovative development of small and medium scale enterprises, Enterprise management strategy, Strategic research on local economy and technological development, Management consulting, Development of rural protected land.
