= Shenyang University of Technology =

University in Shenyang, China

Coordinates: 41.7300°N 123.2450°E

- 沈阳工业大学
- Shěnyáng Gōngyè Dàxué
- Shenyang, Liaoning; China

Information
- Former names: 东北机械管理局技工学校 (The Northeast Machinery Administration Technical School), 机械工业管理局机械职业学校 (The Mechanical Engineering Vocational School of the Machinery Industry Administration, 长春机器制造学校 (Changchun Machine Manufacturing School), 沈阳机器制造学校 (Shenyang Machine Manufacturing School), 沈阳机电学院 (Shenyang Institute of Mechanical and Electrical Engineering)
- Established: 1949
- Headmaster: 张珂 (Zhang Ke)
- Enrollment: 23,259 (Undergraduate), 7,516 (Post-graduate) (April 2026)
- Website: http://www.lianpp.com/sut/xxgk.htm

Shenyang University of Technology (Chinese: 沈阳工业大学; pinyin: Shěnyáng Gōngyè Dàxué; SUT) is a university in Shenyang, Liaoning, China under the provincial government.
