= Liaoning University of Traditional Chinese Medicine =

University in Shenyang, China

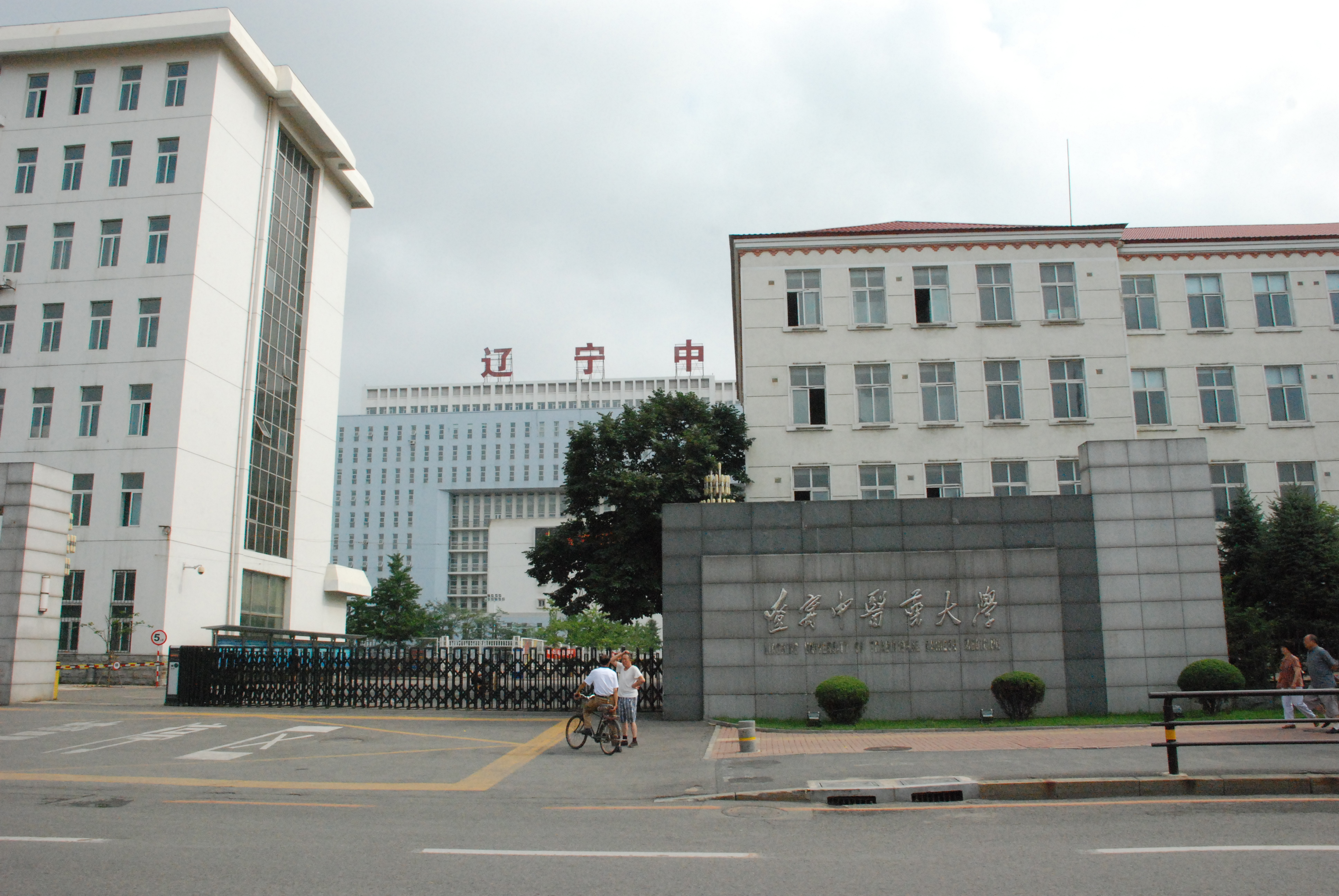
LNUTCM main campus

Liaoning University of Traditional Chinese Medicine or LNUTCM (Chinese: 辽宁中医药大学) is a university in Liaoning Province, China, with its main campus in Huanggu District, Shenyang and a branch campus in Dalian and an additional campus in Benxi.

== History ==
The school was founded in 1958 under the name Liaoning College of Traditional Chinese Medicine (Chinese: 辽宁中医学院) as a merger between the Liaoning Provincial School of Traditional Chinese Medicine and Liaoning Province Traditional Chinese Medicine Hospital. The school was renamed to Liaoning University of Traditional Chinese Medicine in 2006.

The university was among the first batch of institutions authorized to grant master’s degrees and to accept foreign students.
