= List of Shenyang Metro stations =

Map of the Shenyang Metro

The following is a list of stations found within the Shenyang Metro.

== Line 1 ==
Station name		Transfer	Distance km		Location
Pinyin	Chinese	Transfer	Distance km		Location
Shisanhaojie	十三号街		0.00	0.00	Tiexi
Zhongyangdajie	中央大街		1.00	1.00	Tiexi
Qihaojie	七号街		1.40	2.40	Tiexi
Sihaojie	四号街		1.50	3.90	Tiexi
Zhangshi	张士		1.55	5.45	Tiexi
Kaifadadao	开发大道		1.40	6.85	Tiexi
Yuhongguangchang	于洪广场		1.50	8.35	Yuhong
Yingbinlu	迎宾路		1.00	9.35	Yuhong
Zhonggongjie	重工街		1.95	11.30	Tiexi
Qigongjie	启工街		1.05	12.35	Tiexi
Baogongjie	保工街		1.00	13.35	Tiexi
Tiexiguangchang	铁西广场	9	1.40	14.75	Tiexi
Yunfengbeijie	云峰北街		1.15	15.90	Tiexi
Shenyangzhan	沈阳站	SYT	1.60	17.50	Heping
Taiyuanjie	太原街		0.95	18.45	Heping
Nanshichang	南市场		1.20	19.65	Heping
Qingniandajie	青年大街	2	1.10	20.75	Shenhe
Huaiyuanmen	怀远门		1.30	22.05	Shenhe
Zhongjie	中街		1.35	23.40	Shenhe
Dongzhongjie	东中街		0.75	24.15	Dadong
Pangjiangjie	滂江街	10	1.65	25.80	Dadong
Limingguangchang	黎明广场		1.30	27.10	Dadong
Xinhuijie	新惠街				Shenhe
Xinningjie	新宁街				Shenhe
Dongdayingjie	东大营街				Shenhe
Nongyedaxue	农业大学				Shenhe
Qianling	前陵				Hunnan
Donglinggongyuan	东陵公园				Hunnan
Shuiquan	水泉				Hunnan
Boguanbeidajie	伯官北大街				Hunnan
Zhiwuyuan	植物园				Hunnan
Shuangma	双马				Hunnan

== Line 2 ==
Station name		Transfer	Distance km		Location
Pinyin	Chinese	Transfer	Distance km		Location
Putianlu	蒲田路		0.00	0.00	Shenbei
Puhelu	蒲河路		1.12	1.12	Shenbei
Renjiehugongyuan	人杰湖公园		1.55	2.67	Shenbei
Liaoningdaxue	辽宁大学		1.01	3.68	Shenbei
Hangkonghangtiandaxue	航空航天大学		1.43	5.11	Shenbei
Shifandaxue	师范大学		1.30	6.41	Yuhong
Yixueyuan	医学院		2.40	8.81	Huanggu
Santaizi	三台子		2.00	10.81	Huanggu
Lingxi	陵西		1.45	12.26	Huanggu
Xinleyizhi	新乐遗址		0.85	13.11	Huanggu
Beilinggongyuan	北陵公园		1.25	14.36	Huanggu
Zhongyiyaodaxue	中医药大学	10	0.95	15.31	Huanggu
Qishanlu	岐山路		1.25	16.56	Huanggu
Shenyangbeizhan	沈阳北站	SBT	0.85	17.41	Shenhe
Jinrongzhongxin	金融中心		0.80	18.21	Shenhe
Shifuguangchang	市府广场		0.90	19.11	Shenhe
Qingniandajie	青年大街	1	1.35	20.46	Shenhe
Qingniangongyuan	青年公园		0.90	21.36	Shenhe
Gongyezhanlanguan	工业展览馆		1.25	22.61	Heping
Shitushuguan	市图书馆		1.45	24.06	Shenhe
Wulihe	五里河		0.95	25.01	Shenhe
Aotizhongxin	奥体中心	9 Shenyang Modern Tram	1.60	26.61	Hunnan
Yingpanjie	营盘街		1.30	27.91	Hunnan
Shijidasha	世纪大厦	Shenyang Modern Tram	1.35	29.26	Hunnan
Baitahelu	白塔河路	Shenyang Modern Tram	1.45	30.71	Hunnan
Quanyunlu	全运路		0.90	31.61	Hunnan
Shenbendajie	沈本大街	Tram Line 1			Hunnan
Shenzhongdajie	沈中大街	Tram Line 1/3			Hunnan
Shengbowuguan	省博物馆	Tram Line 1/3			Hunnan
Zhongyanggongyuan	中央公园	Tram Line 3			Hunnan
Chuangxinyilu	创新一路	Tram Line 3			Hunnan
Zonghebaoshuiqu	综合保税区				Hunnan
Taoxianjichang	桃仙机场	SHE			Hunnan

== Line 3 ==
Station name		Transfer	Distance km	Location
Pinyin	Chinese	Transfer	Distance km	Location
Lida	李达			Tiexi
Tiexiqichegongchang	铁西汽车工厂			Tiexi
Mabei	马贝			Tiexi
Zhongdedajie	中德大街			Tiexi
Xiheyougu	细河悠谷			Tiexi
Zhaijia	翟家			Tiexi
Gongyedaxue	工业大学			Tiexi
Ningguan	宁官			Tiexi
Yuliang	余良			Tiexi
Ganguan	甘官			Yuhong
Qiandaohujie	千岛湖街			Yuhong
Nanyanghujie	南阳湖街			Yuhong
Datonghujie	大通湖街	9		Yuhong
Nanliguan	南李官			Yuhong
Lingkong	凌空			Tiexi
Shayang	砂阳	4		Heping
Nanbamalu	南八马路			Heping
Jiaxingjie	嘉兴街			Heping
Fangxingguangchang	方型广场			Heping
Sanhaojie	三好街			Heping
Gongyezhanlanguan	工业展览馆	2		Shenhe
Zhongkeyuanjinshusuo	中科院金属所			Shenhe
Nanta	南塔	6		Shenhe
Wenfulu	文富路			Shenhe
Fuminjie	富民街			Shenhe
Jiangdongjie	江东街	10		Shenhe
Fangjialan	方家栏			Shenhe

== Line 4 ==
Station name		Transfer	Distance km	Location
Pinyin	Chinese	Transfer	Distance km	Location
Zhengxinlu	正新路			Dadong
Wenguanjie	文官街			Dadong
Wanghua	望花			Dadong
Guanquanlu	观泉路			Dadong
Beidaying	北大营			Dadong
Hezuojie	合作街	10		Dadong
Taochangjie	洮昌街			Dadong
Shenyangdaxue	沈阳大学			Dadong
Shenyangbeizhan	沈阳北站	2 SBT		Shenhe
Huangsilu	皇寺路			Heping
Shifudalu	市府大路			Heping
Taiyuanjie	太原街	1		Heping
Nanwumalu	南五马路			Heping
Shayang	砂阳			Heping
Nanjingqiao	南京桥			Heping
Changbaidao	长白岛			Heping
Changbainan	长白南	9		Hunnan
Jincanglu	金仓路			Sujiatun
Yunshanlu	云杉路			Hunnan
Hongchunlu	红椿路			Hunnan
Chengjianxueyuan	城建学院	Tram Line 1		Hunnan
Shenyangnanzhan	沈阳南站	SOT		Hunnan
Chuangxinlu	创新路	Tram Line 1/3		Hunnan

== Line 9 ==
Station name		Transfer	Distance km	Location
Pinyin	Chinese	Transfer	Distance km	Location
Nujianggongyuan	怒江公园			Huanggu/Yuhong
Huaihejieshenyieryuan	淮河街沈医二院	10		Huanggu
Huanggutunzhan	皇姑屯站			Huanggu
Zhongxingwenhuaguangchang	重型文化广场			Tiexi
Beierlu	北二路			Tiexi
Tiexiguangchang	铁西广场	1		Tiexi
Xinghuagongyuan	兴华公园			Tiexi
Shenliaolu	沈辽路			Tiexi
Huaxiang	滑翔			Tiexi
Jilihujie	吉力湖街			Yuhong
Datonghujie	大通湖街			Yuhong
Caozhong	曹仲			Heping
Hunhezhan	浑河站	HHT		Heping
Shenglinanjie	胜利南街			Heping/Hunnan
Changbainan	长白南			Heping
Yushutai	榆树台			Hunnan
Jinyangdajie	金阳大街			Hunnan
Caixiajie	彩霞街			Hunnan
Aotizhongxin	奥体中心	2 Shenyang Modern Tram		Hunnan
Tianchengjie	天成街			Hunnan
Langrijie	朗日街	Shenyang Modern Tram		Hunnan
Changqingnanjie	长青南街	10 Shenyang Modern Tram		Hunnan
Jianzhudaxue	建筑大学	Shenyang Modern Tram		Hunnan

== Line 10 ==
Station name		Transfer	Distance km	Location
Pinyin	Chinese	Transfer	Distance km	Location
Dingxianghu	丁香湖			Yuhong
Yuanjiangjie	元江街			Yuhong
Xianggongjie	向工街			Yuhong
Tawanjie	塔湾街			Huanggu
Huaihejieshenyieryuan	淮河街沈医二院	9		Huanggu
Bainiaogongyuan	百鸟公园			Huanggu
Changjiangjie	长江街			Huanggu
Zhongyiyaodaxue	中医药大学	2		Huanggu
Lingdongjie	陵东街			Dadong
Beita	北塔			Dadong
Hezuojie	合作街			Dadong
Dongbeidamalu	东北大马路			Dadong
Pangjiangjie	滂江街	1		Dadong
Chang'anlu	长安路			Dadong
Wanlian	万莲			Dadong
Quanyuan	泉园			Shenhe
Jiangdongjie	江东街			Shenhe
Changqingqiao	长青桥			Shenhe
Changqingnanjie	长青南街	9 Shenyang Modern Tram		Hunnan
Ligongdaxue	理工大学			Hunnan
Zhangshabu	张沙布			Hunnan
