= Hezuojie station =

Shenyang Metro station

Hezuojie 合作街 metro
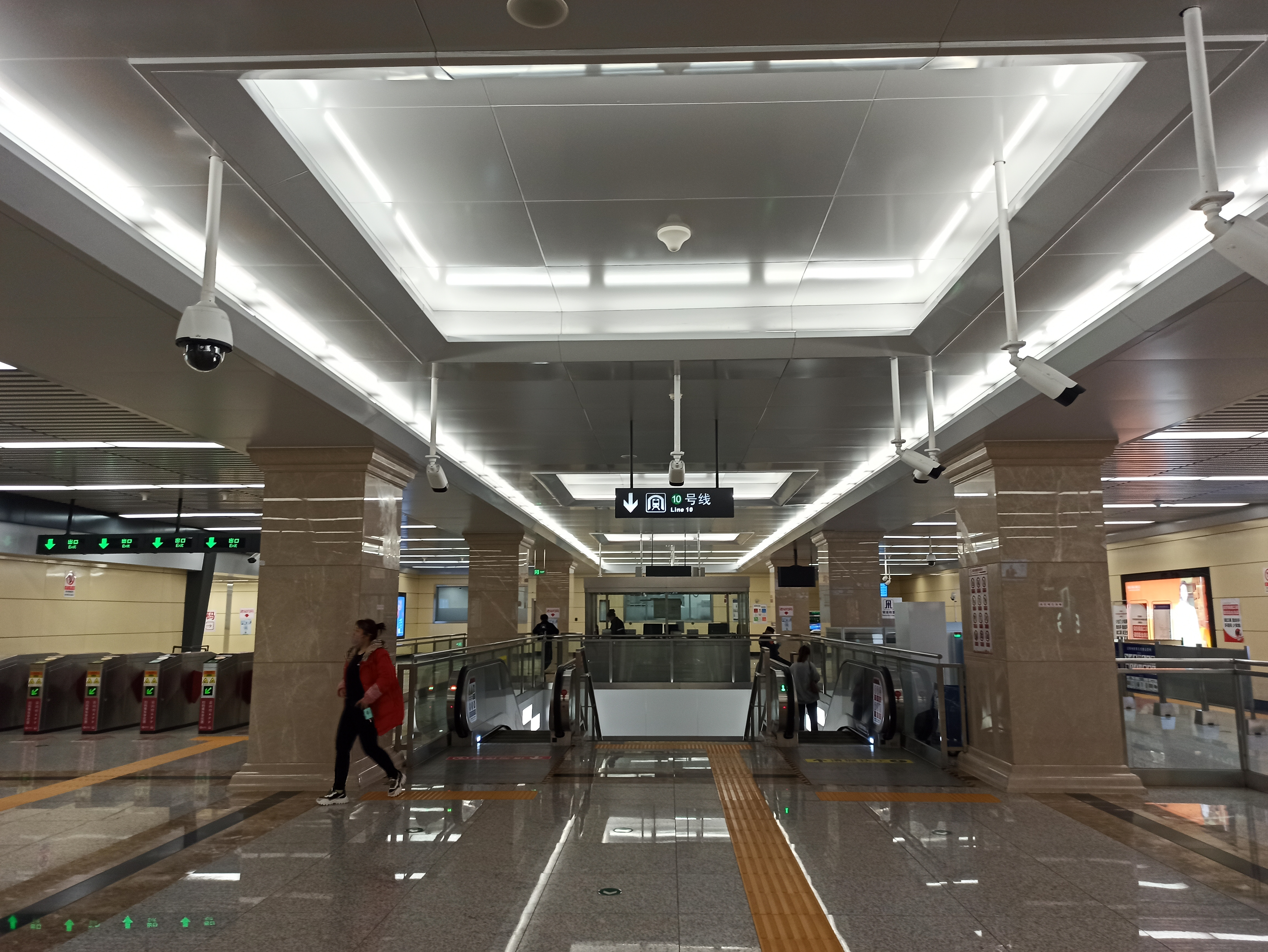

General information
- Location: Intersection of Beihai St. and Hezuo St. Yuhong District, Shenyang, Liaoning; China
- Operator: Shenyang Metro
- Lines: Line 4 Line 10
- Platforms: 4 (2 island platforms)

Construction
- Structure type: Underground
- Accessible: Yes

History
- Opened: 29 April 2020; 6 years ago

Services
Preceding station	Shenyang Metro	Following station
Beidaying towards Zhengxinlu	Line 4	Taochangjie towards Chuangxinlu
Beita towards Dingxianghu	Line 10	Dongbeidamalu towards Zhangshabu
Location

Hezuojie (Chinese: 合作街站; pinyin: Hézuòjiē Zhàn) is a station on Line 4 and Line 10 of the Shenyang Metro. The station opened on 29 April 2020.

== Station Layout ==
G	Entrances and Exits	Exits B, D-G
B1	Concourse	Faregates, Station Agent
B2	Northbound	← Line 10 towards Dingxianghu (Beita)
B2	Island platform, doors open on the left
B2	Southbound	Line 10 towards Zhangshabu (Dongbeidamalu) →
B3	Northbound	← Line 4 towards Zhengxinlu (Beidaying)
B3	Island platform, doors open on the left
B3	Southbound	Line 4 towards Chuangxinlu (Taochangjie) →
