= Line 10 (Shenyang Metro) =

Metro line in Shenyang, China

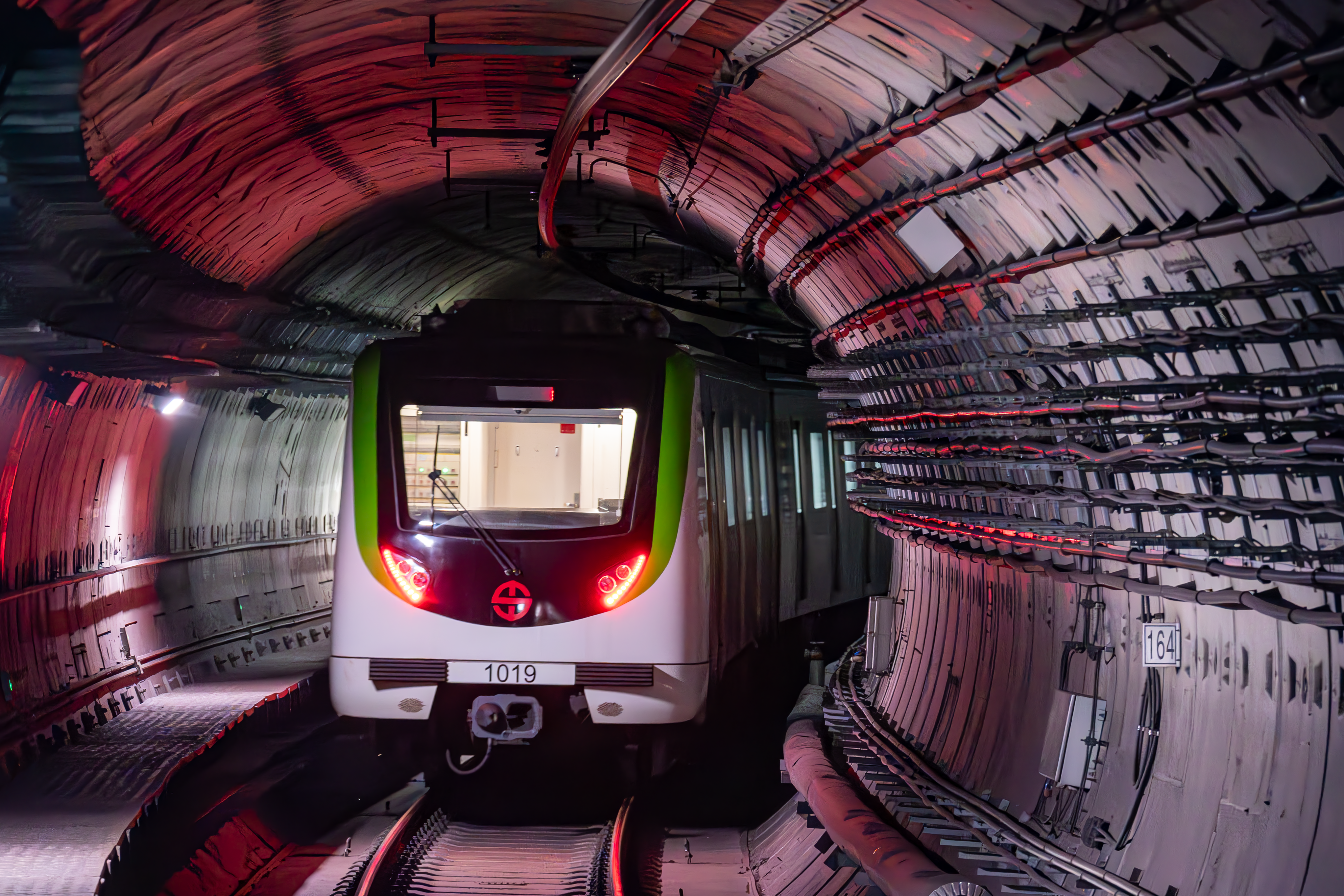
- Line 10 train

Overview
- Status: Operational
- Owner: Shenyang
- Locale: Shenyang, Liaoning, China
- Termini: Dingxianghu; Zhangshabu
- Stations: 21

Service
- Type: Rapid transit
- System: Shenyang Metro
- Services: 1
- Operator: Shenyang Metro Corporation

History
- Opened: 29 April 2020; 6 years ago

Technical
- Line length: 27.21 km (16.91 mi)
- Number of tracks: 2
- Character: Underground
- Track gauge: 1,435 mm (4 ft 8 1/2 in)

Line 10 of the Shenyang Metro (Chinese: 沈阳地铁10号线; pinyin: Shěnyáng Dìtiě Shí Hào Xiàn) is a rapid transit line running from northwest to southwest Shenyang in a "コ" shape. The line opened on 29 April 2020.

The line is 27.21 km long with 21 stations. Line 10, together with Line 9, forms a loop around Shenyang, the provincial capital of Liaoning province, China.

== Opening timeline ==
| Segment | Commencement | Length | Station(s) | Name |
|---|---|---|---|---|
| Dingxianghu — Zhangshabu | 29 April 2020 | 27.21 km (16.91 mi) | 21 | Phase 1 |

== Stations ==
| Station name | | Transfer | Distance km | Location |
| Pinyin | Chinese | Transfer | Distance km | Location |
|---|---|---|---|---|
| Dingxianghu | 丁香湖 | | | Yuhong |
| Yuanjiangjie | 元江街 | | | Yuhong |
| Xianggongjie | 向工街 | | | Yuhong |
| Tawanjie | 塔湾街 | | | Huanggu |
| Huaihejieshenyieryuan | 淮河街沈医二院 | 9 | | Huanggu |
| Bainiaogongyuan | 百鸟公园 | | | Huanggu |
| Changjiangjie | 长江街 | | | Huanggu |
| Zhongyiyaodaxue | 中医药大学 | 2 | | Huanggu |
| Lingdongjie | 陵东街 | | | Dadong |
| Beita | 北塔 | | | Dadong |
| Hezuojie | 合作街 | 4 | | Dadong |
| Dongbeidamalu | 东北大马路 | | | Dadong |
| Pangjiangjie | 滂江街 | 1 | | Dadong |
| Chang'anlu | 长安路 | | | Dadong |
| Wanlian | 万莲 | | | Dadong |
| Quanyuan | 泉园 | | | Shenhe |
| Jiangdongjie | 江东街 | 3 | | Shenhe |
| Changqingqiao | 长青桥 | | | Shenhe |
| Changqingnanjie | 长青南街 | 9 Tram Line 5 | | Hunnan |
| Ligongdaxue | 理工大学 | | | Hunnan |
| Zhangshabu | 张沙布 | | | Hunnan |
