= Tawanjie station =

Shenyang Metro station

Tawanjie 塔湾街 metro
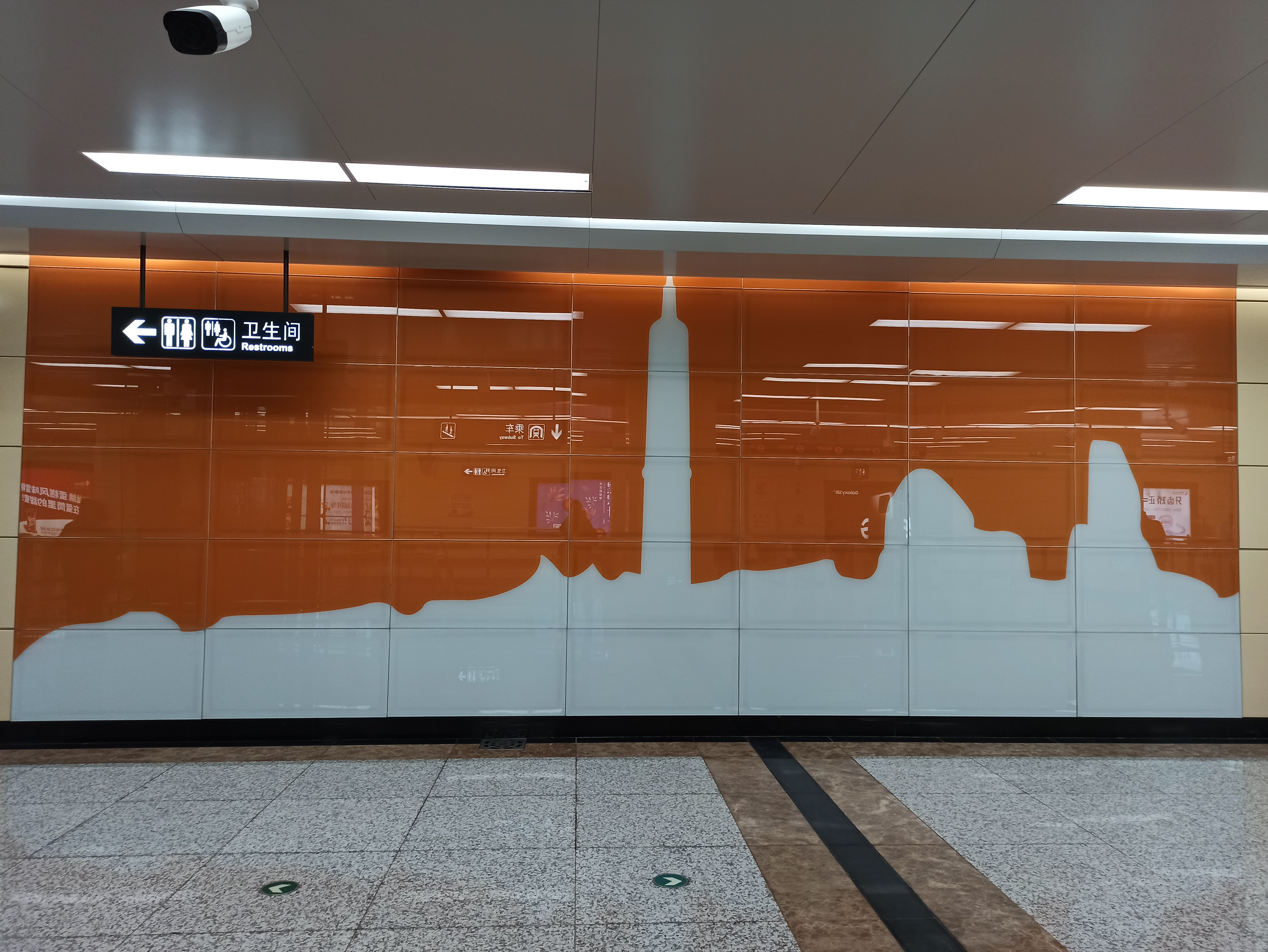

General information
- Location: Intersection of Kunshan West Rd. and Tawan St. Yuhong District, Shenyang, Liaoning; China
- Operator: Shenyang Metro
- Line: Line 10
- Platforms: 2

Construction
- Structure type: Underground
- Accessible: Yes

History
- Opened: 29 April 2020; 6 years ago

Services
| Preceding station | Shenyang Metro | Following station |
|---|---|---|
| Xianggongjie towards Dingxianghu | Line 10 | Huaihejieshenyieryuan towards Zhangshabu |
Location

Tawanjie (Chinese: 塔湾街站; pinyin: Tǎwānjiē Zhàn) is a station on Line 10 of the Shenyang Metro. The station opened on 29 April 2020.

== Station Layout ==
| G | Entrances and Exits | Exits C-D |
| B1 | Concourse | Faregates, Station Agent |
| B2 | Northbound | ← Line 10 towards Dingxianghu (Xianggongjie) |
| B2 | Island platform, doors open on the left |
| B2 | Southbound | Line 10 towards Zhangshabu (Huaihejieshenyieryuan) → |
