= Pangjiangjie station =

Shenyang Metro interchange station

Pangjiangjie 滂江街
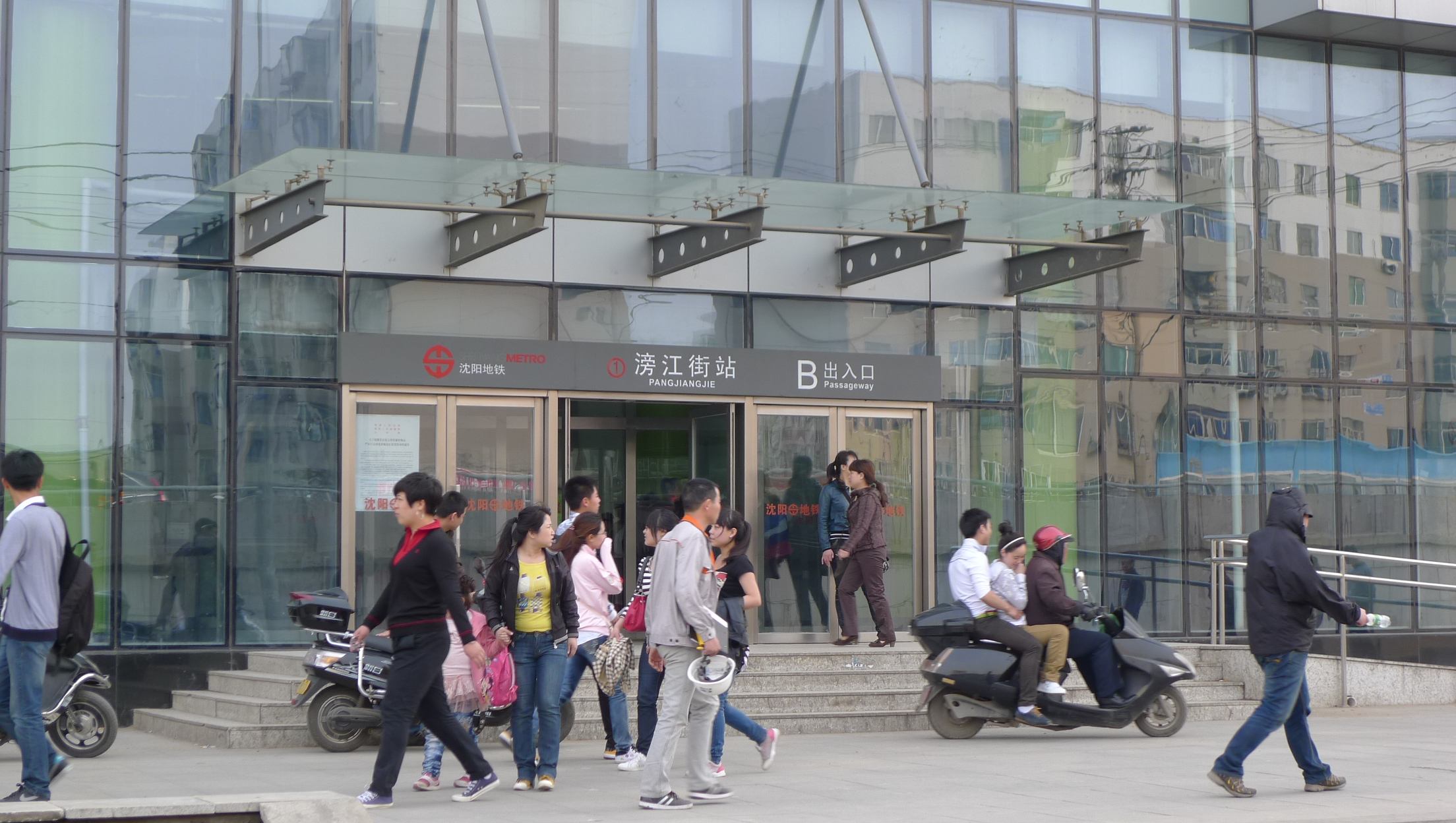
- Exit B

General information
- Location: Intersection of Panjiang St. and Zhulin Rd. Dadong District, Shenyang, Liaoning; China
- Coordinates: 41°48′32″N 123°29′18″E
- Operator: Shenyang Metro
- Lines: Line 1 Line 10
- Platforms: 4

Construction
- Structure type: Underground
- Accessible: Yes

Other information
- Station code: L1/02

History
- Opened: 27 September 2010; 15 years ago (line 1); 29 April 2020; 6 years ago (line 10)

Services
Preceding station	Shenyang Metro	Following station
Dongzhongjie towards Shisanhaojie	Line 1	Limingguangchang towards Shuangma
Dongbeidamalu towards Dingxianghu	Line 10	Chang'anlu towards Zhangshabu
Location

Panjiangjie (Chinese: 滂江街站; pinyin: Pāngjiāngjiē Zhàn) is an interchange station on lines 1 and 10 of the Shenyang Metro. The line 1 station opened on 27 September 2010, and the line 10 station opened on 29 April 2020.

== Station Layout ==
G	Line 1 concourse	Exits A-H, Faregates, Station Agent
B1	Line 10 Concourse	Faregates, Station Agent
M	Interchange corridor
B2	Westbound	← Line 1 towards Shisanhaojie (Dongzhongjie)
B2	Island platform, doors open on the left
B2	Eastbound	Line 1 towards Shuangma (Limingguangchang) →
B2	Northbound	← Line 10 towards Dingxianghu (Dongbeidamalu)
B2	Island platform, doors open on the left
B2	Southbound	Line 10 towards Zhangshabu (Chang'anlu) →
