= Dongbeidamalu station =

Shenyang Metro station

Dongbeidamalu 东北大马路 metro
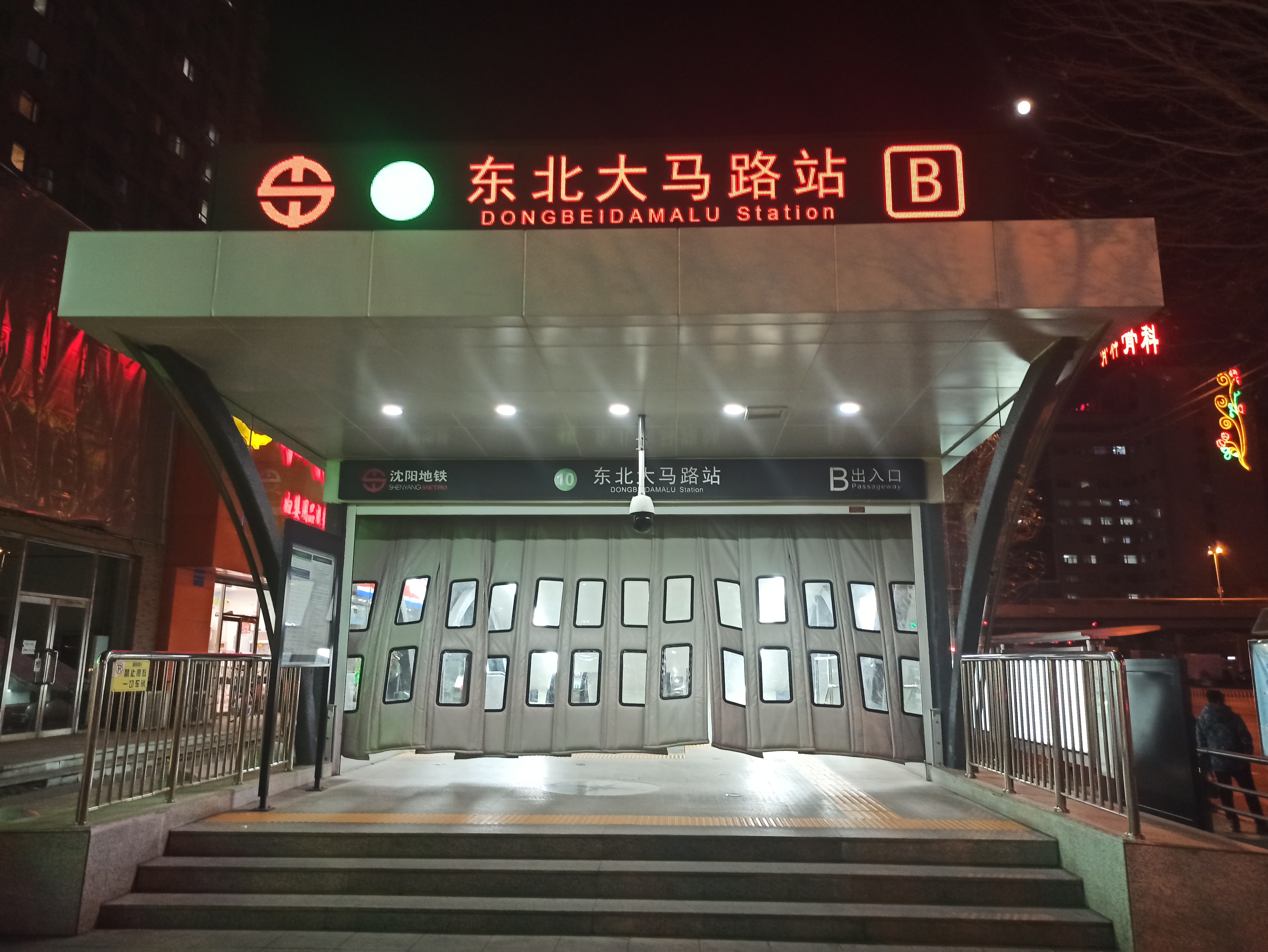

General information
- Location: Intersection of Beihai St. and Dongbeidama Rd. Dadong District, Shenyang, Liaoning; China
- Operator: Shenyang Metro
- Line: Line 10
- Platforms: 2

Construction
- Structure type: Underground
- Accessible: Yes

History
- Opened: 29 April 2020; 6 years ago

Services
Preceding station	Shenyang Metro	Following station
Hezuojie towards Dingxianghu	Line 10	Pangjiangjie towards Zhangshabu
Location

Dongbeidamalu (Chinese: 东北大马路站; pinyin: Dōngběidàmǎlù Zhàn) is a station on Line 10 of the Shenyang Metro. The station opened on 29 April 2020.

== Station Layout ==
G	Entrances and Exits	Exits B-D
B1	Concourse	Faregates, Station Agent
B2	Northbound	← Line 10 towards Dingxianghu (Hezuojie)
B2	Island platform, doors open on the left
B2	Southbound	Line 10 towards Zhangshabu (Pangjiangjie) →
