= Chang'anlu station =

Shenyang Metro station

Coordinates: 41.7966°N 123.4798°E

Chang'anlu 长安路 metro
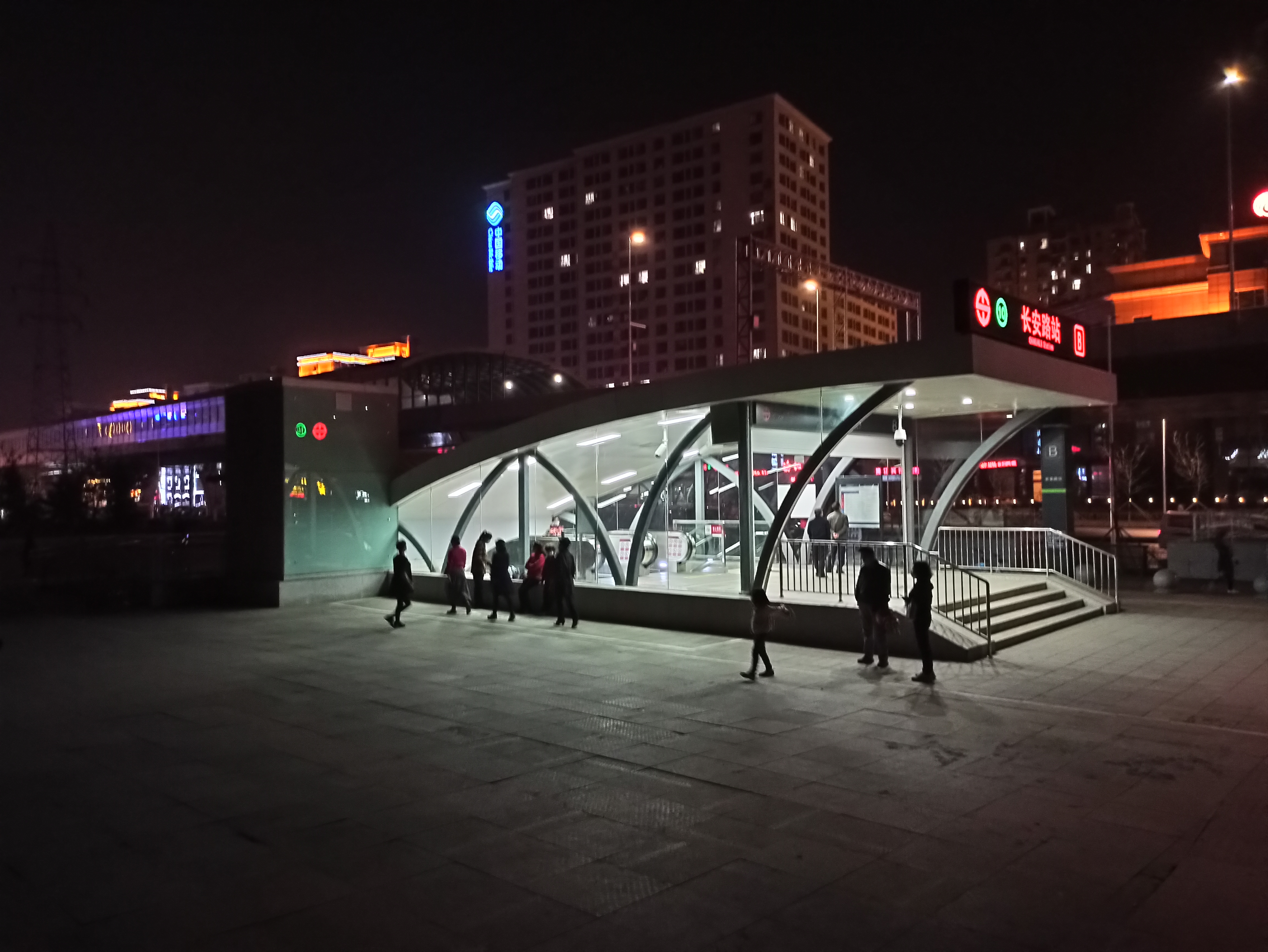

General information
- Location: Intersection of Pangjiang St. and Chang'an Rd. Yuhong District, Shenyang, Liaoning; China
- Operator: Shenyang Metro
- Line: Line 10
- Platforms: 2

Construction
- Structure type: Underground
- Accessible: Yes

History
- Opened: 29 April 2020; 6 years ago

Services
Preceding station	Shenyang Metro	Following station
Pangjiangjie towards Dingxianghu	Line 10	Wanlian towards Zhangshabu
Location

Chang'anlu (Chinese: 长安路站; pinyin: Cháng'ānlù Zhàn) is a station on Line 10 of the Shenyang Metro. The station opened on 29 April 2020.

== Station Layout ==
G	Entrances and Exits	Exits B-G
B1	Concourse	Faregates, Station Agent
B2	Northbound	← Line 10 towards Dingxianghu (Pangjiangjie)
B2	Island platform, doors open on the left
B2	Southbound	Line 10 towards Zhangshabu (Wanlian) →
