= Quanyuan station =

Shenyang Metro station

Quanyuan 泉园 metro
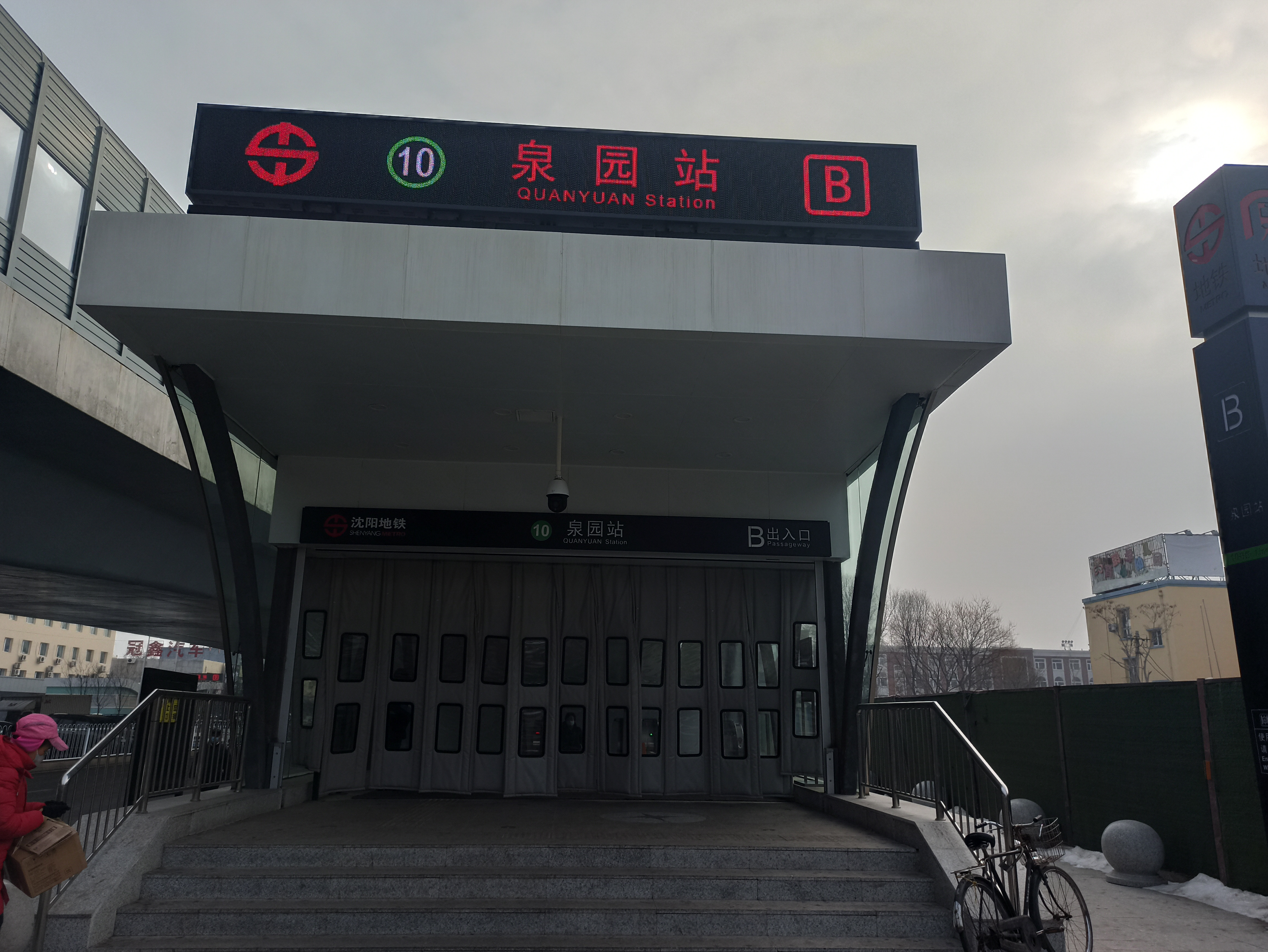

General information
- Location: Intersection of Changqing Rd. and Quanyuanyi Rd. Yuhong District, Shenyang, Liaoning; China
- Coordinates: 41.77528°N 123.47236°E
- Operator: Shenyang Metro
- Line: Line 10
- Platforms: 2

Construction
- Structure type: Underground
- Accessible: Yes

History
- Opened: 29 April 2020; 6 years ago

Services
Preceding station	Shenyang Metro	Following station
Wanlian towards Dingxianghu	Line 10	Jiangdongjie towards Zhangshabu
Location

Quanyuan (Chinese: 泉园站; pinyin: Quányuán Zhàn) is a station on Line 10 of the Shenyang Metro. The station opened on 29 April 2020.

== Station Layout ==
G	Entrances and Exits	Exits A-D
B1	Concourse	Faregates, Station Agent
B2	Northbound	← Line 10 towards Dingxianghu (Wanlian)
B2	Island platform, doors open on the left
B2	Southbound	Line 10 towards Zhangshabu (Jiangdongjie) →
