= Zhongyiyaodaxue station =

Shenyang Metro interchange station

Zhongyiyaodaxue 中医药大学 metro
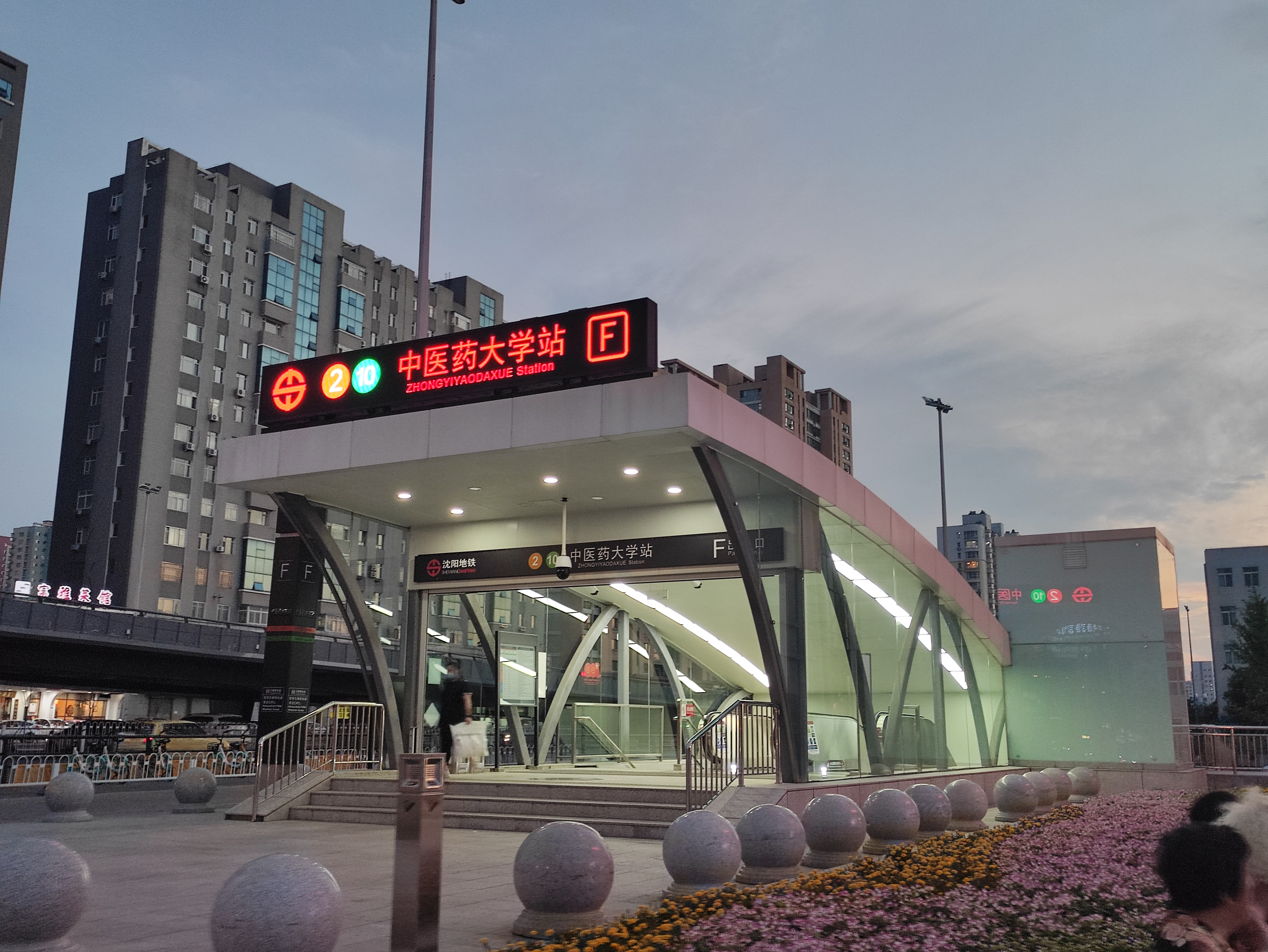
- Station entrance

General information
- Location: Intersection of Chongshan East Rd. and Beiling St. Dadong District, Shenyang, Liaoning; China
- Coordinates: 41°49′57″N 123°25′45″E
- Operator: Shenyang Metro
- Lines: Line 2 Line 10
- Platforms: 4

Construction
- Structure type: Underground
- Accessible: Yes

Other information
- Station code: L2/15

History
- Opened: 30 December 2011; 14 years ago (line 2); 29 April 2020; 6 years ago (line 10)

Services
Preceding station	Shenyang Metro	Following station
Beilinggongyuan towards Putianlu	Line 2	Qishanlu towards Taoxianjichang
Changjiangjie towards Dingxianghu	Line 10	Lingdongjie towards Zhangshabu
Location

Zhongyiyaodaxue (Chinese: 中医药大学站; pinyin: Zhōngyīyàodàxué Zhàn) is an interchange station on lines 2 and 10 of the Shenyang Metro. The line 2 station opened on 30 December 2011, and the line 10 station opened on 29 April 2020. The station serves Liaoning University of Traditional Chinese Medicine.

== Station Layout ==
G	Entrances and Exits	Exits A-H
B1	Concourse	Faregates, Station Agent
B2	Northbound	← Line 10 towards Dingxianghu (Changjiangjie)
B2	Island platform, doors open on the left
B2	Southbound	Line 10 towards Zhangshabu (Lingdongjie) →
B2	Northbound	← Line 2 towards Putianlu (Beilinggongyuan)
B2	Island platform, doors open on the left
B2	Southbound	Line 2 towards Taoxianjichang (Qishanlu) →
