= Jiangdongjie station =

Shenyang Metro station

Jiangdongjie 江东街 metro
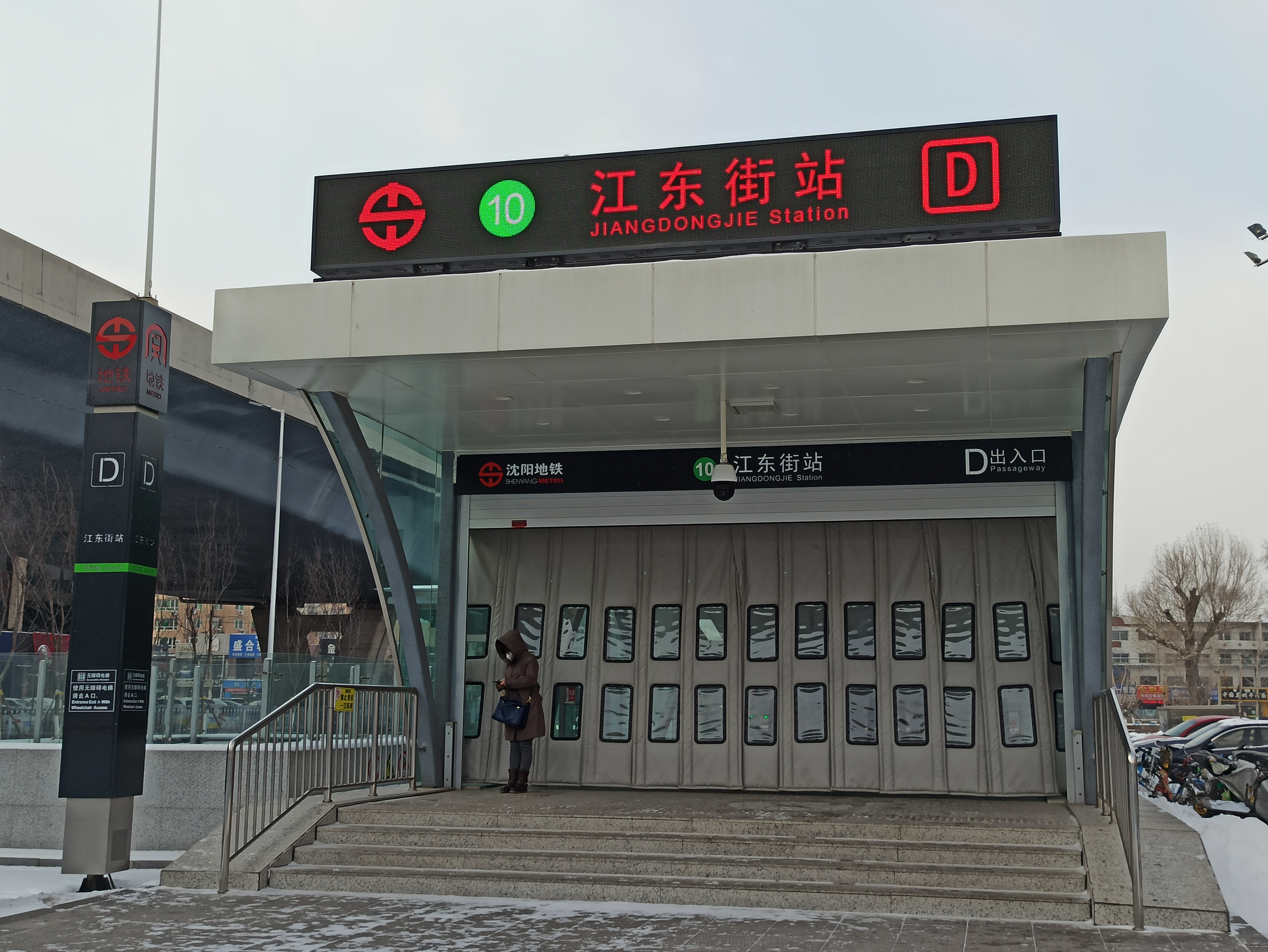

General information
- Location: Intersection of Changqing St. and Jiangdong St. Shenhe District, Shenyang, Liaoning; China
- Operator: Shenyang Metro
- Lines: Line 3 Line 10
- Platforms: 2

Construction
- Structure type: Underground
- Accessible: Yes

History
- Opened: 29 April 2020; 6 years ago (Line 10); 30 June 2026; 56 days ago (Line 3)

Services
Preceding station	Shenyang Metro	Following station
Fuminjie towards Lida	Line 3	Fangjialan Terminus
Quanyuan towards Dingxianghu	Line 10	Changqingqiao towards Zhangshabu
Location

Jiangdongjie (Chinese: 江东街站; pinyin: Jiāngdōngjiē Zhàn) is a station on Line 3 and Line 10 of the Shenyang Metro. The Line 10 station opened on 29 April 2020. The Line 3 station opened on 30 June 2026.

== Station Layout ==
G	Entrances and Exits	Exits B-G
B1	Concourse	Faregates, Station Agent, Transfer Channel
B2 (Line 10)	Northbound	← Line 10 towards Dingxianghu (Quanyuan)
B2 (Line 10)	Island platform, doors open on the left
B2 (Line 10)	Southbound	Line 10 towards Zhangshabu (Changqingqiao) →
B2 (Line 3)	Westbound	← Line 3 towards Lida (Fuminjie)
B2 (Line 3)	Island platform, doors open on the left
B2 (Line 3)	Eastbound	Line 3 towards Fangjialan (Terminus) →
