= Wanlian station =

Shenyang Metro station

Wanlian 万莲
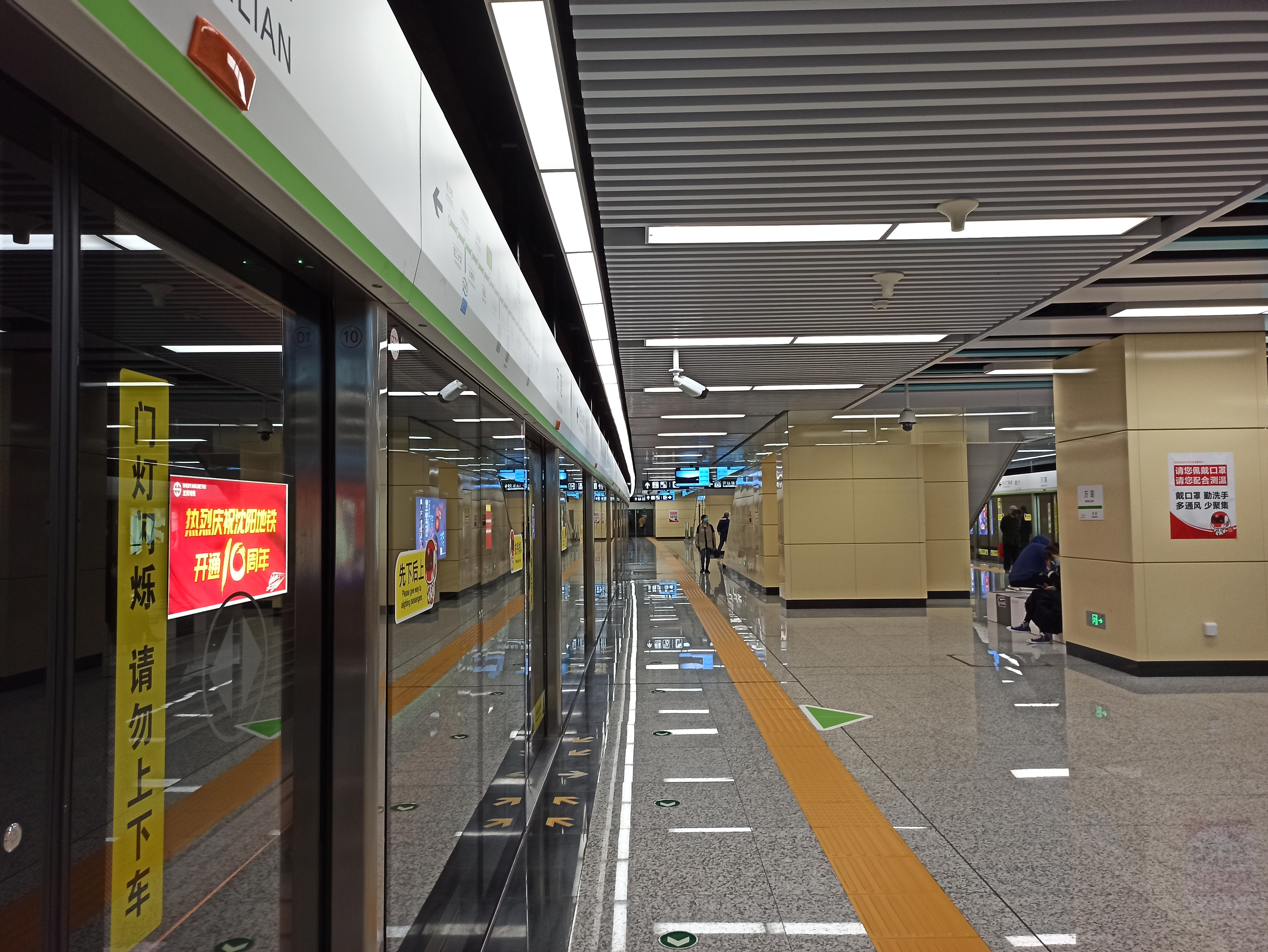

General information
- Location: Intersection of Panjiang St. and Xiaoheyan Rd. Dadong District, Shenyang, Liaoning; China
- Operator: Shenyang Metro
- Line: Line 10
- Platforms: 2

Construction
- Structure type: Underground
- Accessible: Yes

History
- Opened: 29 April 2020; 6 years ago

Services
Preceding station	Shenyang Metro	Following station
Chang'anlu towards Dingxianghu	Line 10	Quanyuan towards Zhangshabu
Location

Wanlian (Chinese: 万莲站; pinyin: Wànlián Zhàn) is a station on Line 10 of the Shenyang Metro. The station opened on 29 April 2020.

== Station Layout ==
G	Entrances and Exits	Exits A-C
B1	Concourse	Faregates, Station Agent
B2	Northbound	← Line 10 towards Dingxianghu (Chang'anlu)
B2	Island platform, doors open on the left
B2	Southbound	Line 10 towards Zhangshabu (Quanyuan) →
