= Huaihejieshenyieryuan station =

Shenyang Metro interchange station

Huaihejieshenyieryuan 淮河街沈医二院 metro
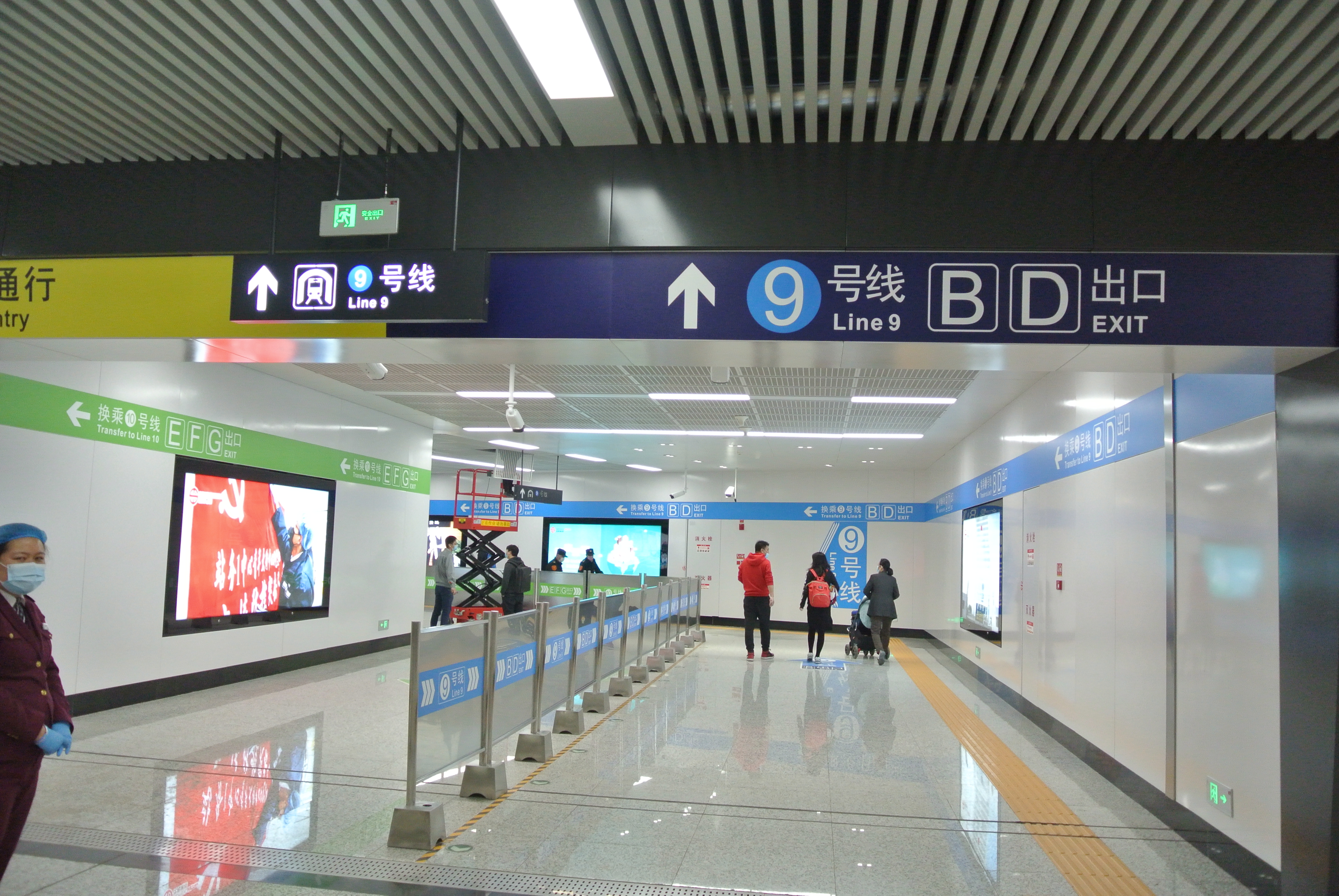

General information
- Location: Intersection of Huaihe St. and Chongshan West Rd. Huanggu District, Shenyang, Liaoning; China
- Coordinates: 41.82819°N 123.38462°E
- Operator: Shenyang Metro
- Lines: Line 9 Line 10
- Platforms: 4

Construction
- Structure type: Underground
- Accessible: Yes

History
- Opened: 25 May 2019; 7 years ago (Line 9); 29 April 2020; 6 years ago (Line 10)

Services
Preceding station	Shenyang Metro	Following station
Nujianggongyuan Terminus	Line 9	Huanggutunzhan towards Jianzhudaxue
Tawanjie towards Dingxianghu	Line 10	Bainiaogongyuan towards Zhangshabu
Location

Huaihejieshenyieryuan (Chinese: 淮河街沈医二院站; pinyin: Huáihéjiēshěnyīèryuàn Zhàn) is an interchange station on lines 9 and 10 of the Shenyang Metro in Shenyang, Liaoning, China. The Line 9 station opened on 25 May 2019, and the Line 10 station on 29 April 2020.

== Station Layout ==
G	Entrances and Exits	Exits B-G
B1	Concourse	Faregates, Station Agent
B2	Northbound	← Line 10 towards Dingxianghu (Tawanjie)
B2	Island platform, doors open on the left
B2	Southbound	Line 10 towards Zhangshabu (Bainiaogongyuan) →
B3	Northbound	← Line 9 towards Nujianggongyuan (Terminus)
B3	Island platform, doors open on the left
B3	Southbound	Line 9 towards Jianzhudaxue (Huanggutunzhan) →
