= Royal Wanxin International Tower =

Hotel in Heping District, Shenyang, China

Coordinates: 41.754444°N 123.4375°E

Royal Wanxin International Tower (Chinese: 皇朝万鑫酒店) is a 267-metre-tall (876 ft) skyscraper and hotel in Heping District, Shenyang, China. Construction started in 2004 and it opened in July 2009. A fire broke out in February 2011 but there were no reported casualties. It is the 3rd tallest building in Shenyang, and was the tallest when it was completed.
