= Changqingnanjie station =

Shenyang Metro interchange station

Changqingnanjie 长青南街 metro
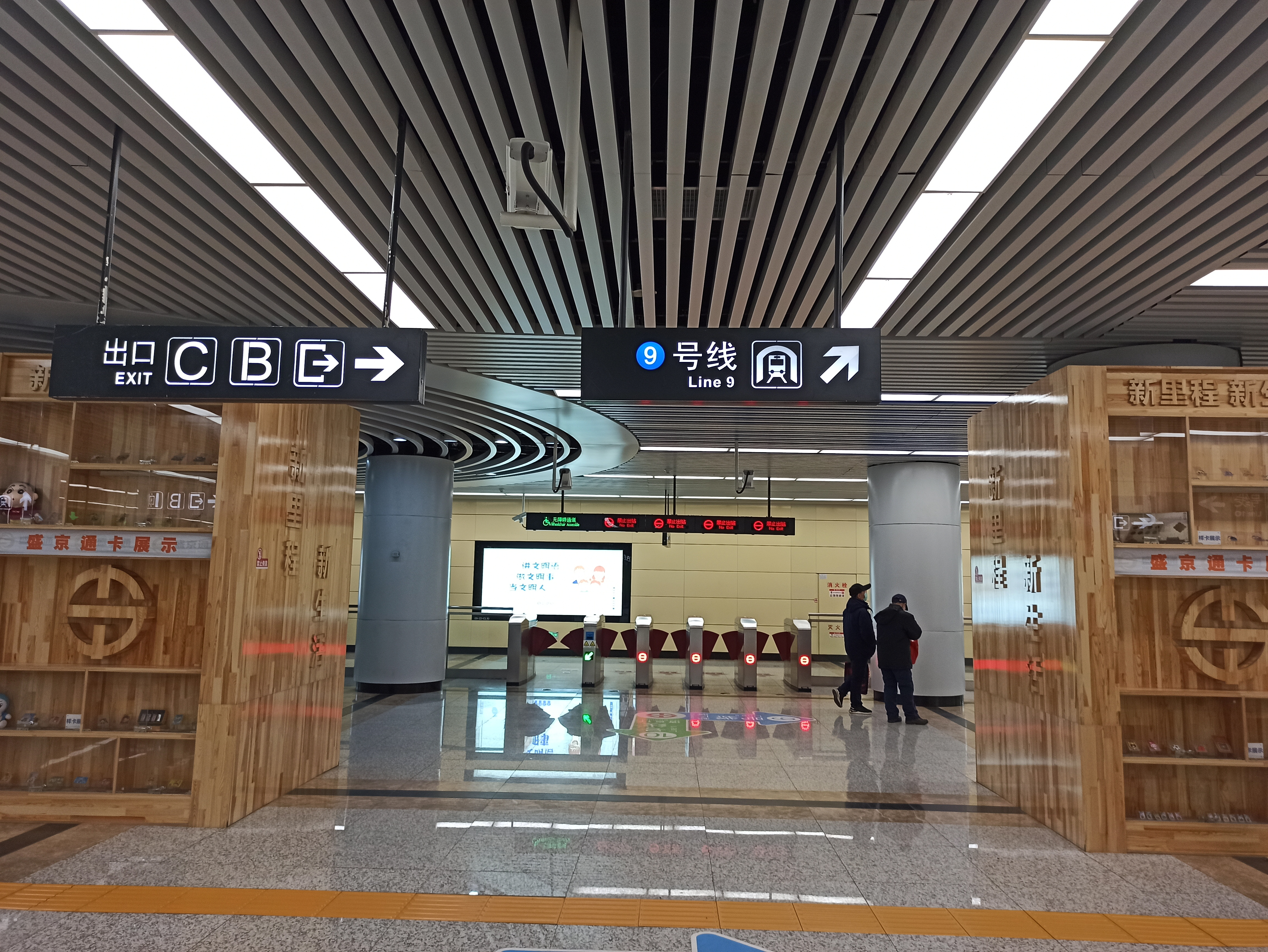

General information
- Location: Intersection of Changqing St. and Hunnan Rd. Huanggu District, Shenyang, Liaoning; China
- Coordinates: 41.74206°N 123.4958°E
- Operator: Shenyang Metro
- Lines: Line 9 Line 10
- Platforms: 4

Construction
- Structure type: Underground
- Accessible: Yes

History
- Opened: 25 May 2019; 7 years ago (Line 9); 29 April 2020; 6 years ago (Line 10)

Services
Preceding station	Shenyang Metro	Following station
Langrijie towards Nujianggongyuan	Line 9	Jianzhudaxue Terminus
Changqingqiao towards Dingxianghu	Line 10	Ligongdaxue towards Zhangshabu
Location

Changqingnanjie (Chinese: 长青南街站; pinyin: Chángqīngnánjiē Zhàn) is an interchange station on lines 9 and 10 of the Shenyang Metro. The Line 9 station opened on 25 May 2019, and the Line 10 station opened on 29 April 2020.

== Station Layout ==
G	Entrances and Exits	Exits A-F
B1	Concourse	Faregates, Station Agent
B2	Northbound	← Line 9 towards Nujianggongyuan (Langrijie)
B2	Island platform, doors open on the left
B2	Southbound	Line 9 towards Jianzhudaxue (Terminus) →
B3	Northbound	← Line 10 towards Dingxianghu (Changqingqiao)
B3	Island platform, doors open on the left
B3	Southbound	Line 10 towards Zhangshabu (Ligongdaxue) →
