= Yuanjiangjie station =

Shenyang Metro station

Yuanjiangjie 元江街 metro
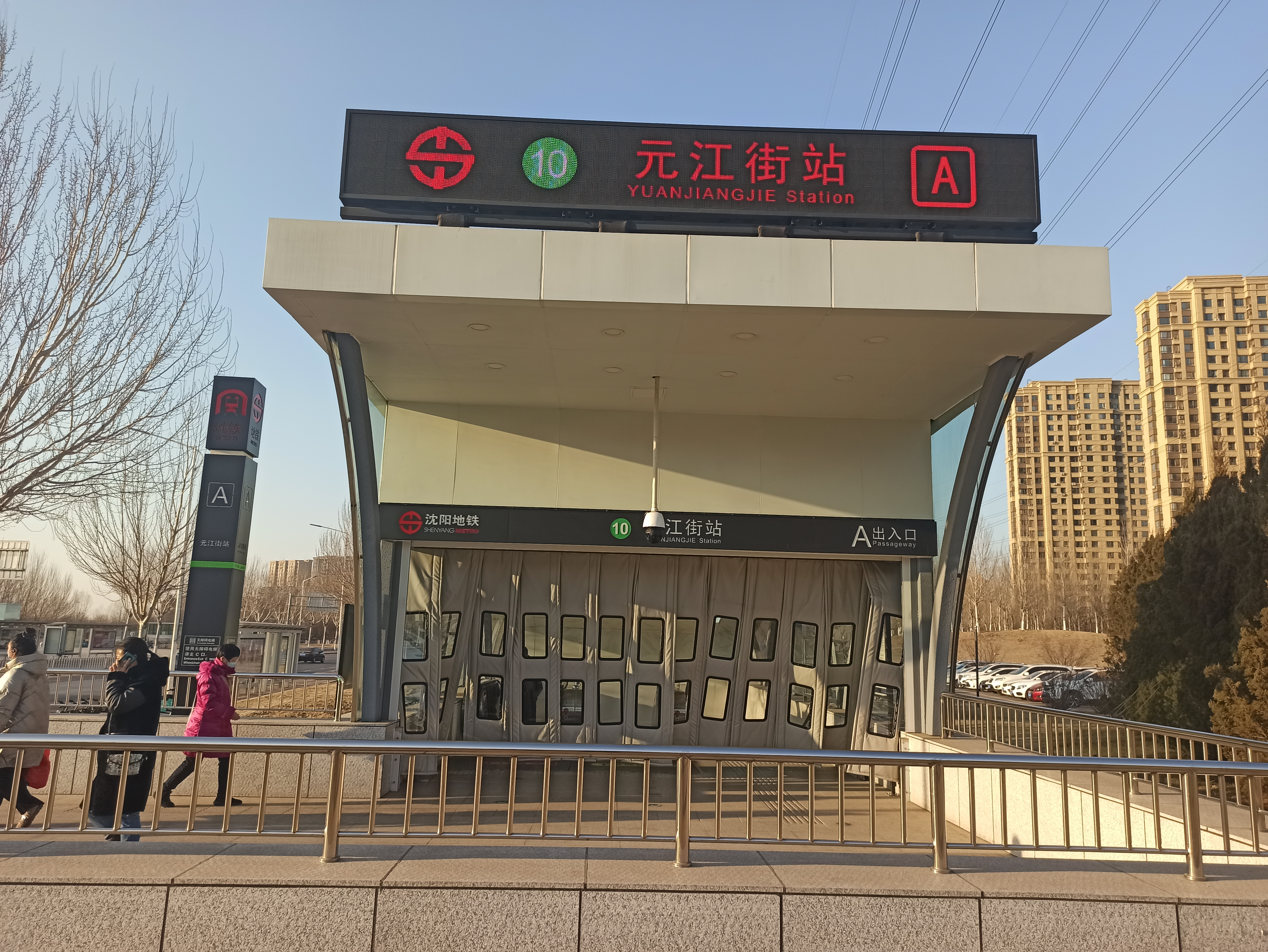

General information
- Location: Intersection of Baishan Rd. and Yuanjiang St. Yuhong District, Shenyang, Liaoning; China
- Coordinates: 41°50′56.22″N 123°21′0.61″E
- Operator: Shenyang Metro
- Line: Line 10
- Platforms: 2

Construction
- Structure type: Underground
- Accessible: Yes

History
- Opened: 29 April 2020; 6 years ago

Services
Preceding station	Shenyang Metro	Following station
Dingxianghu Terminus	Line 10	Xianggongjie towards Zhangshabu
Location

Yuanjiangjie (Chinese: 元江街站; pinyin: Yuánjiāngjiē Zhàn) is a station on Line 10 of the Shenyang Metro. The station opened on 29 April 2020.

== Station Layout ==
G	Entrances and Exits	Exits A-C
B1	Concourse	Faregates, Station Agent
B2	Northbound	← Line 10 towards Dingxianghu (Terminus)
B2	Island platform, doors open on the left
B2	Southbound	Line 10 towards Zhangshabu (Xianggongjie) →
