= Beita station =

Shenyang Metro station

Beita 北塔
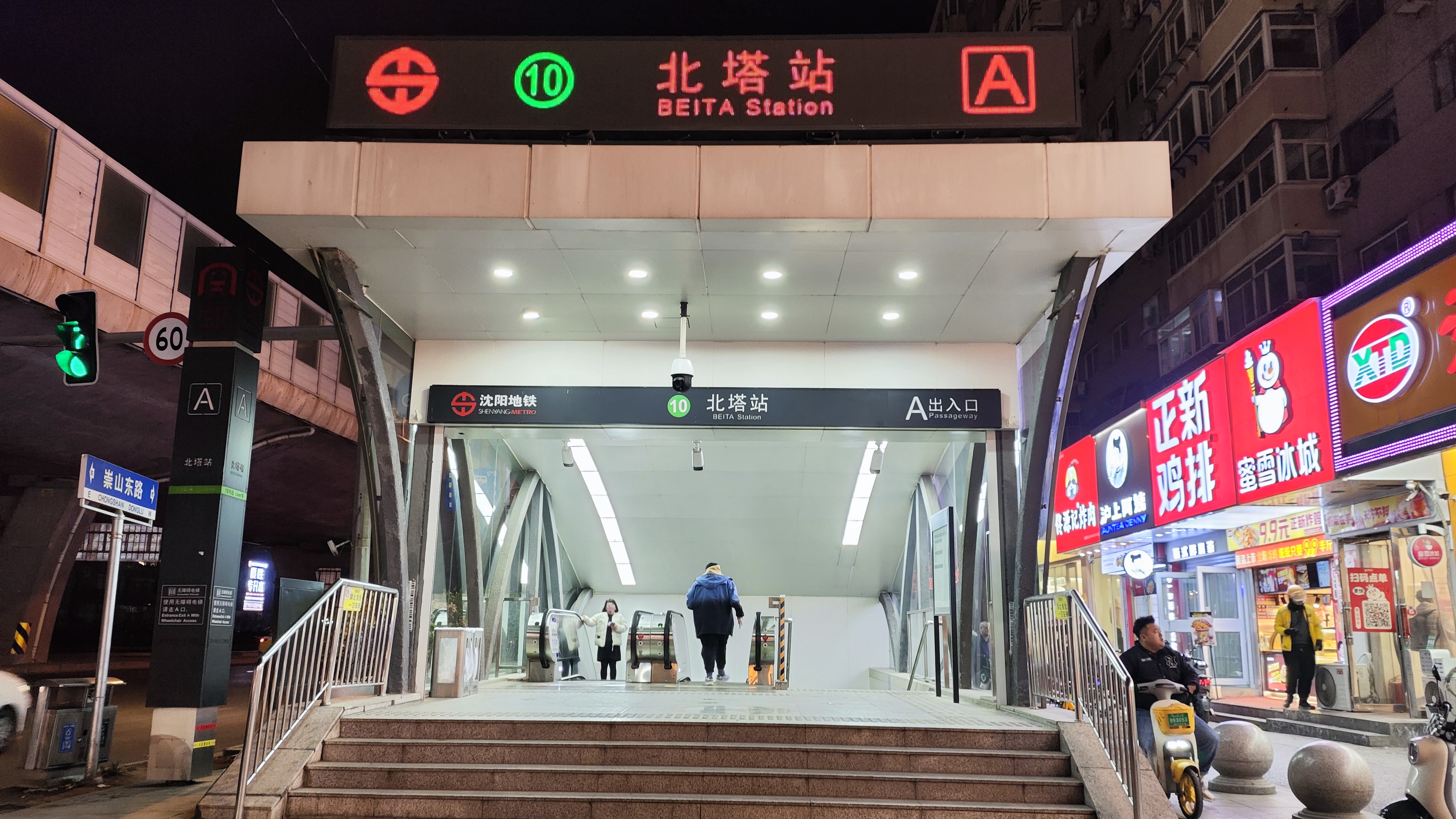

General information
- Location: Intersection of Chongshan East Rd. and Liutiaohu St. Huanggu District, Shenyang, Liaoning; China
- Coordinates: 41.83123°N 123.4494°E
- Operator: Shenyang Metro
- Line: Line 10
- Platforms: 2

Construction
- Structure type: Underground
- Accessible: Yes

History
- Opened: 29 April 2020; 6 years ago

Services
| Preceding station | Shenyang Metro | Following station |
|---|---|---|
| Lingdongjie towards Dingxianghu | Line 10 | Hezuojie towards Zhangshabu |
Location

Beita (Chinese: 北塔站; pinyin: Běitǎ Zhàn) is a station on Line 10 of the Shenyang Metro. The station opened on 29 April 2020.

The under construction Line 6 will serve this station in the future.

== Station Layout ==
| G | Entrances and Exits | Exits A-C |
| B1 | Concourse | Faregates, Station Agent |
| B2 | Northbound | ← Line 10 towards Dingxianghu (Lingdongjie) |
| B2 | Island platform, doors open on the left |
| B2 | Southbound | Line 10 towards Zhangshabu (Hezuojie) → |
