= Ligongdaxue station =

Shenyang Metro station

Ligongdaxue 理工大学 metro
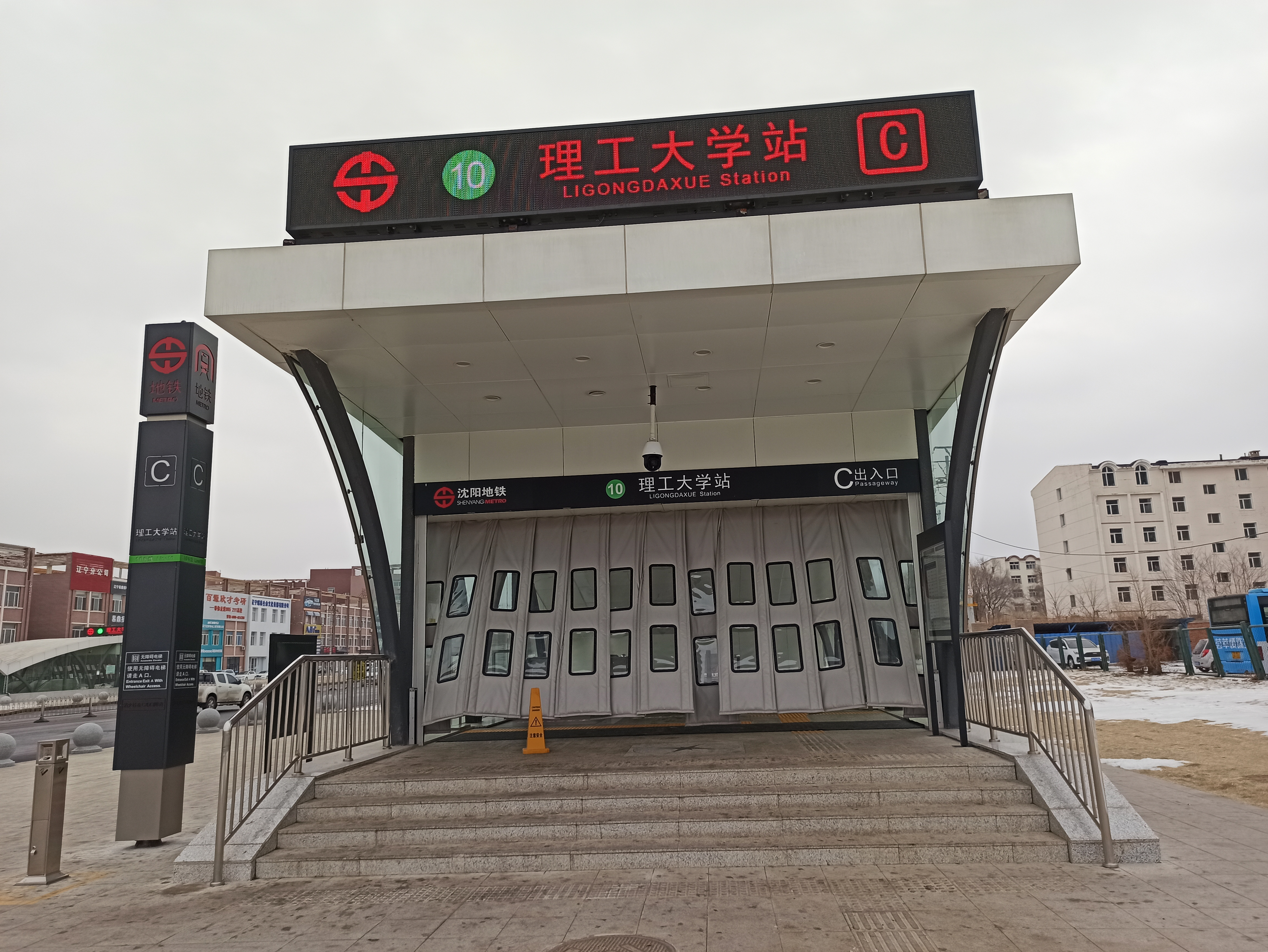

General information
- Location: Intersection of Changqing St. and Quandong Rd. Hunnan District, Shenyang, Liaoning; China
- Operator: Shenyang Metro
- Line: Line 10
- Platforms: 2

Construction
- Structure type: Underground
- Accessible: Yes

History
- Opened: 29 April 2020; 6 years ago

Services
Preceding station	Shenyang Metro	Following station
Changqingnanjie towards Dingxianghu	Line 10	Zhangshabu Terminus
Location

Ligongdaxue (Chinese: 理工大学站; pinyin: Lǐgōngdàxué Zhàn) is a station on Line 10 of the Shenyang Metro. The station opened on 29 April 2020.

== Station Layout ==
G	Entrances and Exits	Exits A-D
B1	Concourse	Faregates, Station Agent
B2	Northbound	← Line 10 towards Dingxianghu (Changqingnanjie)
B2	Island platform, doors open on the left
B2	Southbound	Line 10 towards Zhangshabu (Terminus) →
