= Limingguangchang station =

Shenyang Metro station

Limingguangchang 黎明广场 metro
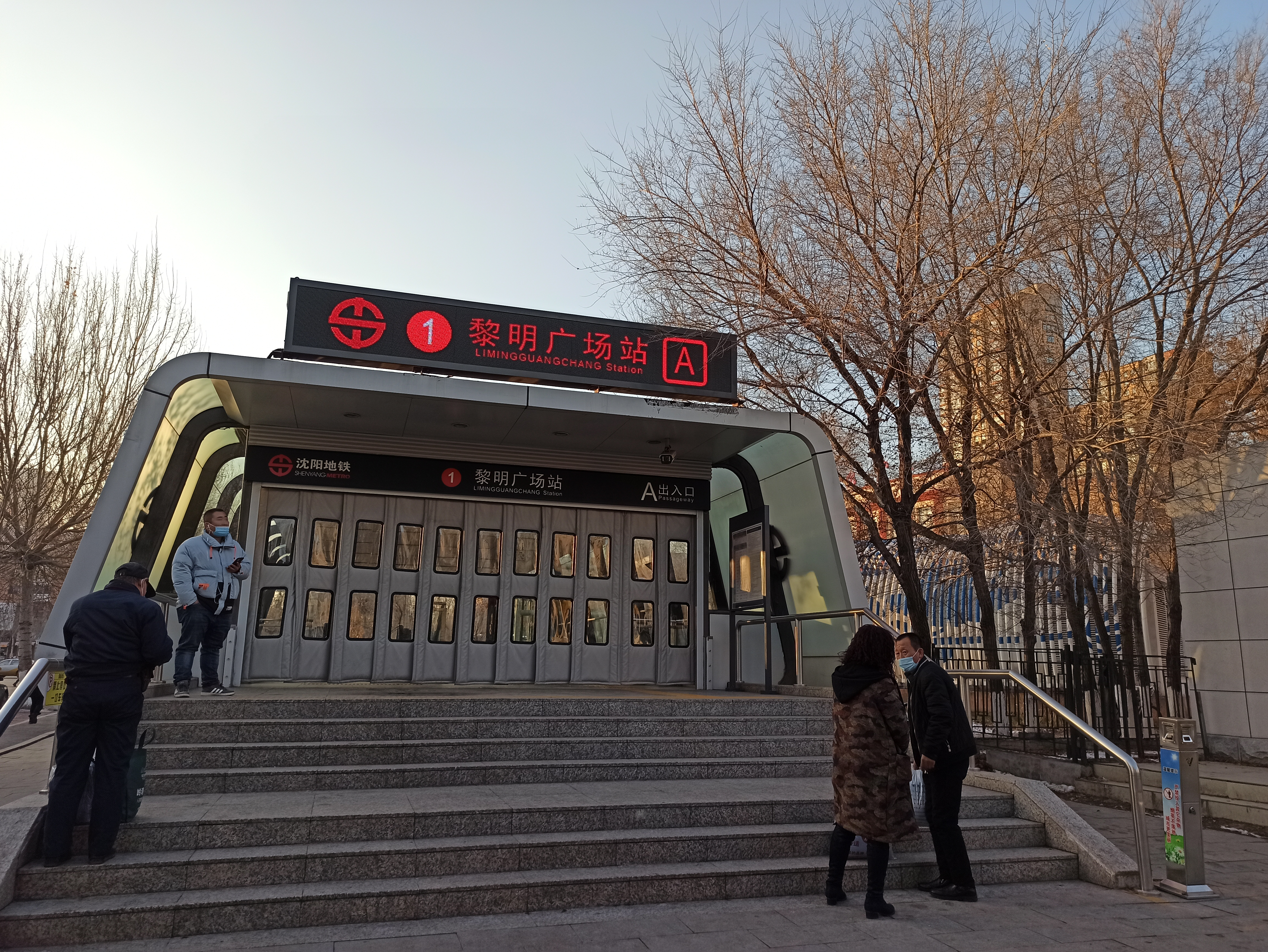

General information
- Location: Hemu Rd. Dadong District, Shenyang, Liaoning; China
- Coordinates: 41°48′29″N 123°30′19″E
- Operator: Shenyang Metro
- Line: Line 1
- Platforms: 2

Construction
- Structure type: Underground
- Accessible: Yes

Other information
- Station code: L1/01

History
- Opened: 27 September 2010; 15 years ago

Services
Preceding station	Shenyang Metro	Following station
Pangjiangjie towards Shisanhaojie	Line 1	Xinhuijie towards Shuangma
Location

Limingguangchang (Chinese: 黎明广场站; pinyin: Límíngguǎngchǎng Zhàn) is a station on Line 1 of the Shenyang Metro. The station opened on 27 September 2010. It was the eastern terminus of Line 1 until the Phase 2 extension to Shuangma opened on 30 June 2025.

== Station Layout ==
G	Entrances and Exits	Exits A-D
B1	Concourse	Faregates, Station Agent
B1	Side platform, doors open on the right
B1	Westbound	← Line 1 towards Shisanhaojie (Pangjiangjie)
B1	Eastbound	Line 1 towards Shuangma (Xinhuijie) →
B1	Side platform, doors open on the right
B1	Concourse	Faregates, Station Agent
B2	Underpass
