= Wanquan Subdistrict =

Wanquan Subdistrict 万泉街道
- Subdistrict
- Location in Liaoning
- Coordinates: 41°47′43″N 123°28′13″E
- Country: People's Republic of China
- Province: Liaoning
- Prefecture-level city: Shenyang
- District: Dadong District
- Time zone: UTC+8 (China Standard)

Wanquan Subdistrict (simplified Chinese: 万泉街道; traditional Chinese: 萬泉街道; pinyin: Wànquán Jiēdào) is a subdistrict of Dadong District, in the east of Shenyang City, the capital of Liaoning province, China. It covers an area of 3.74 square kilometres (1.44 sq mi), with 21,908 people. As of 2018, it has 7 residential communities under its administration.
