= Sujiatun, Shenyang =

Sujiatun 苏家屯区
- District
- Location in Liaoning
- Coordinates: 41°40′13″N 123°20′47″E
- Country: People's Republic of China
- Province: Liaoning
- Sub-provincial city: Shenyang

Area
  - Total: 782 km^{2} (302 sq mi)

Population (2020)
  - Total: 524,336
  - Density: 671/km^{2} (1,740/sq mi)
- Time zone: UTC+8 (China Standard)

Sujiatun District (simplified Chinese: 苏家屯区; traditional Chinese: 蘇家屯區; pinyin: Sūjiātún Qū) is one of ten districts of the prefecture-level city of Shenyang, the capital of Liaoning Province, Northeast China, and forms part of the southern suburbs. The current population of Sujiatun is 430,000 and is located 15 km away from central Shenyang. Sujiatun is known mostly for its agricultural and industrial activity. It borders the districts of Yuhong and Heping to the north, Dongling to the northeast, Tiexi to the northwest; it also borders the prefecture-level cities of Fushun to the east, Benxi to the southeast, and Liaoyang to the southwest.

== Administrative divisions ==
There are seven subdistricts, seven towns, and five townships within the district.

Subdistricts:

- Jiefang Subdistrict (解放街道), Tieyou Subdistrict (铁友街道), Minzhu Subdistrict (民主街道), Linhu Subdistrict (临湖街道), Zhongxing Subdistrict (中兴街道), Huxi Subdistrict (湖西街道), Chengjiao Subdistrict (城郊街道)

Towns:

- Chenxiangtun (陈相屯镇), Shilihe (十里河镇), Honglingbao (红菱堡镇), Linshengbao (林盛堡镇), Bayi (八一镇), Yaoqianhutun (姚千户屯镇), Shahebao (沙河堡镇)

Townships:

- Wanggangbao Township (王纲堡乡), Yongle Township (永乐乡), Baiqingzhai Township (白清寨乡), Tonggou Township (佟沟乡), Dagou Township (大沟乡)

== Climate ==
Climate data for Sujiatun District, elevation 35 m (115 ft), (1991–2020 normals)
Month	Jan	Feb	Mar	Apr	May	Jun	Jul	Aug	Sep	Oct	Nov	Dec	Year
Mean daily maximum °C (°F)	−4.5 (23.9)	0.4 (32.7)	7.7 (45.9)	17.3 (63.1)	24.2 (75.6)	28.0 (82.4)	29.9 (85.8)	29.3 (84.7)	24.8 (76.6)	16.6 (61.9)	6.1 (43.0)	−2.3 (27.9)	14.8 (58.6)
Daily mean °C (°F)	−9.8 (14.4)	−5.0 (23.0)	2.4 (36.3)	11.3 (52.3)	18.4 (65.1)	22.9 (73.2)	25.5 (77.9)	24.6 (76.3)	19.0 (66.2)	10.8 (51.4)	1.2 (34.2)	−7.2 (19.0)	9.5 (49.1)
Mean daily minimum °C (°F)	−14.3 (6.3)	−9.7 (14.5)	−2.4 (27.7)	5.7 (42.3)	12.9 (55.2)	18.3 (64.9)	21.7 (71.1)	20.6 (69.1)	14.0 (57.2)	5.9 (42.6)	−3.0 (26.6)	−11.3 (11.7)	4.9 (40.8)
Average precipitation mm (inches)	5.0 (0.20)	8.5 (0.33)	15.0 (0.59)	32.0 (1.26)	59.2 (2.33)	89.1 (3.51)	159.4 (6.28)	152.9 (6.02)	51.2 (2.02)	42.2 (1.66)	21.7 (0.85)	11.3 (0.44)	647.5 (25.49)
Average precipitation days (≥ 0.1 mm)	3.2	3.4	4.6	6.4	9.2	11.5	11.7	10.5	6.5	6.7	5.6	3.9	83.2
Average snowy days	4.4	4.3	4.0	1.0	0	0	0	0	0	0.5	3.5	5.5	23.2
Average relative humidity (%)	58	51	48	47	52	65	75	75	66	61	59	60	60
Mean monthly sunshine hours	161.5	185.3	217.6	220.9	241.3	215.0	193.3	200.7	210.2	194.3	151.1	144.5	2,335.7
Percentage possible sunshine	55	62	59	55	53	47	42	47	57	57	52	51	53
Source: China Meteorological Administration
