= Heping, Shenyang =

Heping 和平区
- District
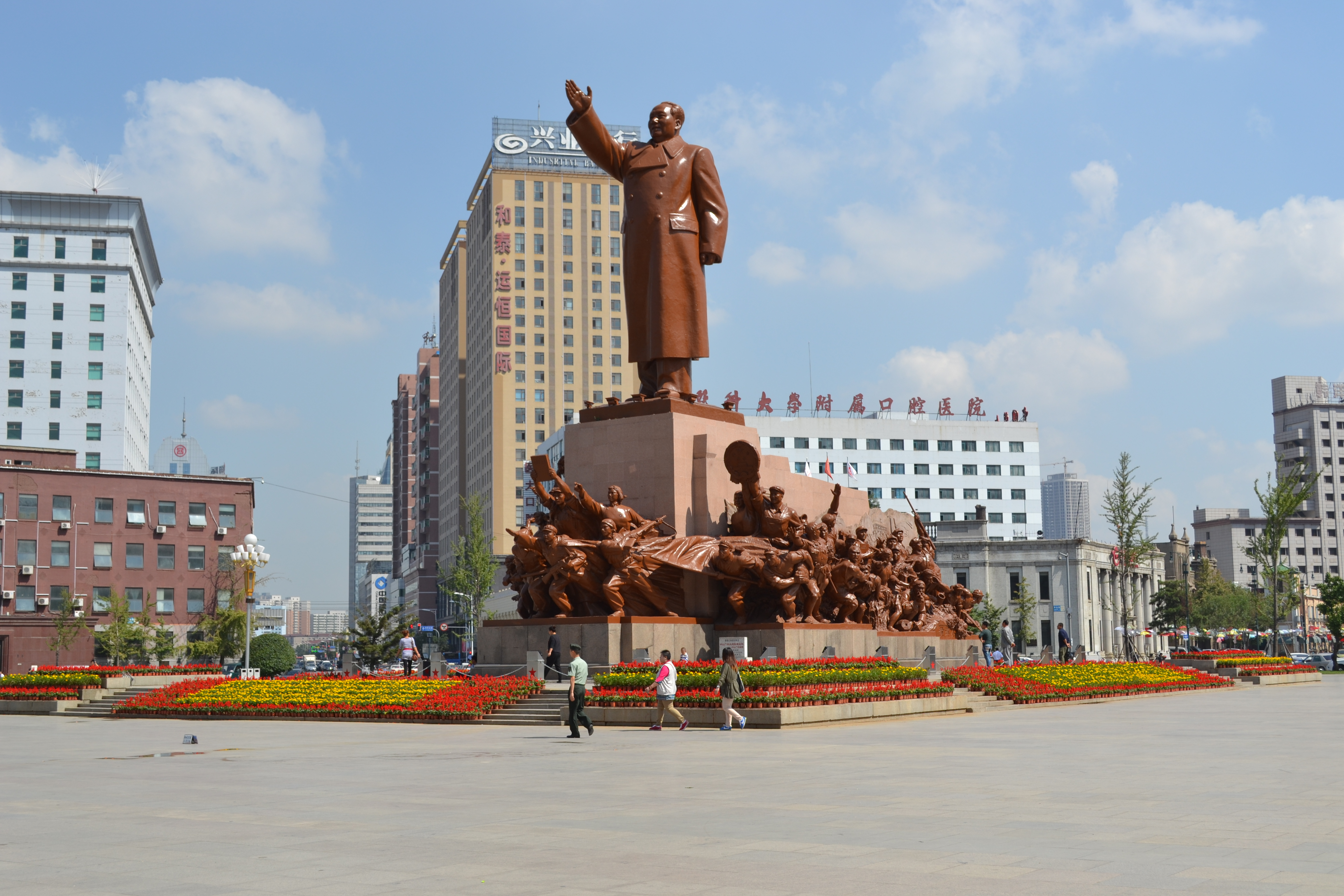
- Statue of Mao Zedong in Zhongshan Square

- Location in Liaoning
- Coordinates: 41°45′14″N 123°22′56″E
- Country: People's Republic of China
- Province: Liaoning
- Sub-provincial city: Shenyang

Area
  - Total: 60 km^{2} (23 sq mi)

Population (2020)
  - Total: 730,785
  - Density: 12,000/km^{2} (32,000/sq mi)
- Time zone: UTC+8 (China Standard)
- Postal code: 110001~110006

Heping District (Chinese: 和平区; pinyin: Hépíng Qū; lit. 'peace district') is one of ten districts of the Chinese sub-provincial city of Shenyang, the capital of the Northeastern province of Liaoning. It borders the districts of Huanggu to the north, Shenhe to the east, Dongling to the southeast, Sujiatun to the south, and Tiexi and Yuhong to the west.

Heping, Shenyang
- Simplified Chinese: 和平区
- Traditional Chinese: 和平區
- Literal meaning: Peace
Transcriptions
Standard Mandarin
- Hanyu Pinyin: Hépíng Qū

== Economy ==
Northeast Electricity, China Post, railways, other such industrial hubs and many media outlets such as Liaoning Radio and Television, Shenyang Radio and Television as well as the Shenyang Daily newspaper are also located in this district.

All Nippon Airways has its Shenyang Office in Tower 2 of City Plaza Shenyang in the district.

== Politics ==
Heping District is also the core area for many political institutions in the Northeast, including CPC Liaoning Provincial Committee, headquarters of the Northern Theater Command (previously the Shenyang Military Region), General Logistics Department and the consulates-general of the United States, Japan, South Korea, North Korea and other countries.

== Administrative divisions ==
Heping District administers the following 10 subdistricts:

- Hunhewan Subdistrict
- Xinhua Subdistrict
- Maluwan Subdistrict
- Nanhu Subdistrict
- Changbai Subdistrict
- Taiyuan Street Subdistrict
- Beishichang Subdistrict
- Nanshichang Subdistrict
- Shenshuiwan Subdistrict
- Hunhezhan West Subdistrict

== Transport ==
The district, better known as the downtown, sprung up around Shenyang Railway Station (known locally as the "South Station" in contrast to the "North Station" in Shenhe District), the former hub of the South Manchurian Railway.

== Education ==
=== Tertiary Education ===
Northeastern University, a Chinese Project 985 university, has its main campus located on Wenhua Road in Heping District. It is a national university under Ministry of Education of the People's Republic of China, and was ranked the 40th best university in China by the 2019 Best Chinese Universities Ranking.

The Shenyang Conservatory of Music has its main campus located on Sanhao Street in Heping District.

=== Secondary Education ===
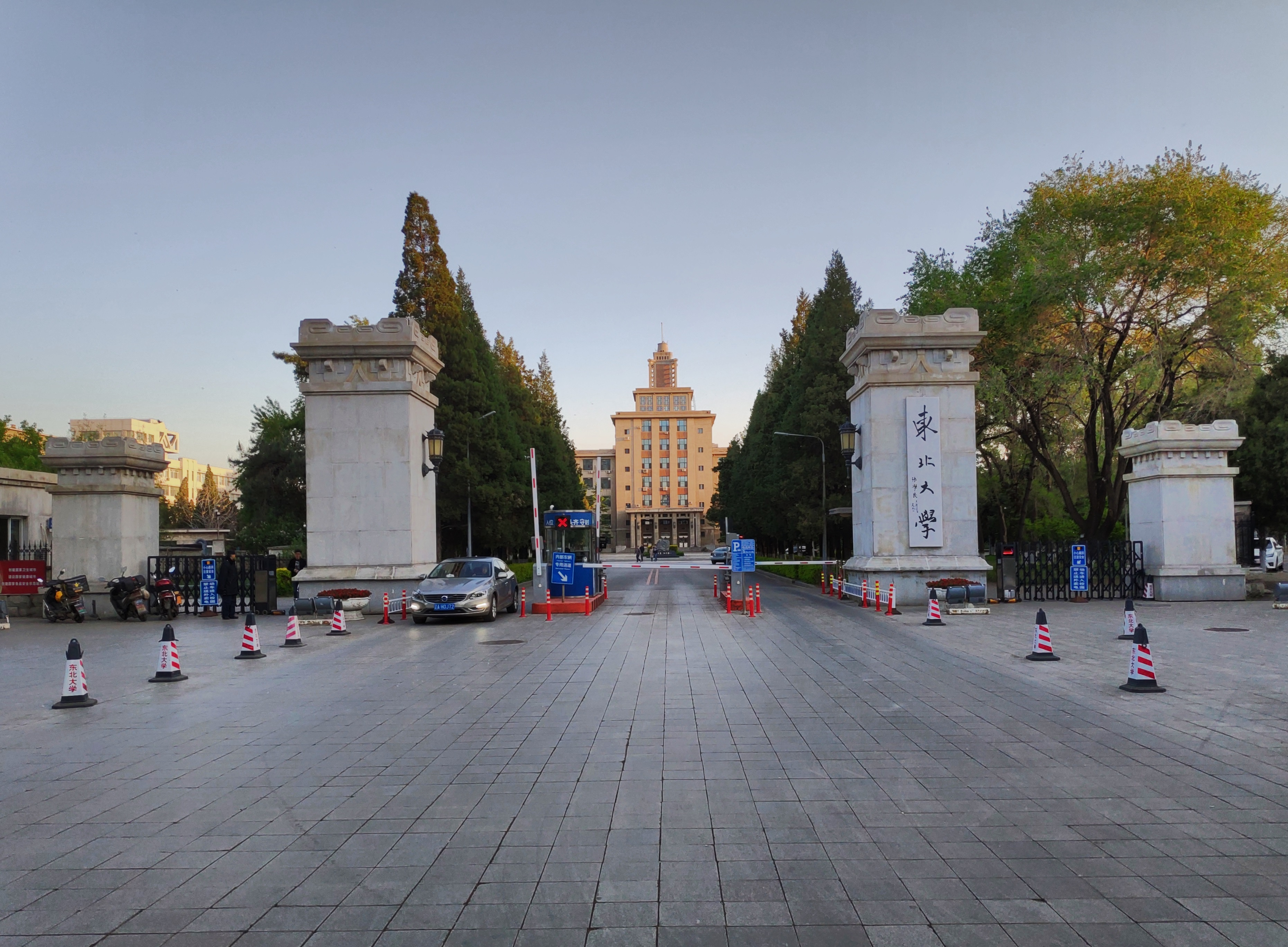
Northestern University (China).

Zhongshan High School of Northeast is located in Heping District.

== Visitor attractions ==
Heping District has all manner of commercial businesses that are brightly neon-lit at night, centered around Taiyuan Street (太原街; Taìyuán Jīe), one of the most famous shopping districts in Northeast China. At the center of the district is Zhongshan Square (中山广场; Zhōngshān Guǎngchǎng), which features one of China's largest statues of Chairman Mao—a record of the era of the Cultural Revolution. Northwest of Zhongshan Square lies the West Pagoda Korean Neighborhood or Koreatown. Many of the boulevards in this area are lined of very large ginkgo trees, which become golden in color and produce their distinctive fruits in autumn.

== See also ==
- Xita
