= Shenhe, Shenyang =

District in Shenyang, Liaoning, China

Shenhe 沈河区
- District
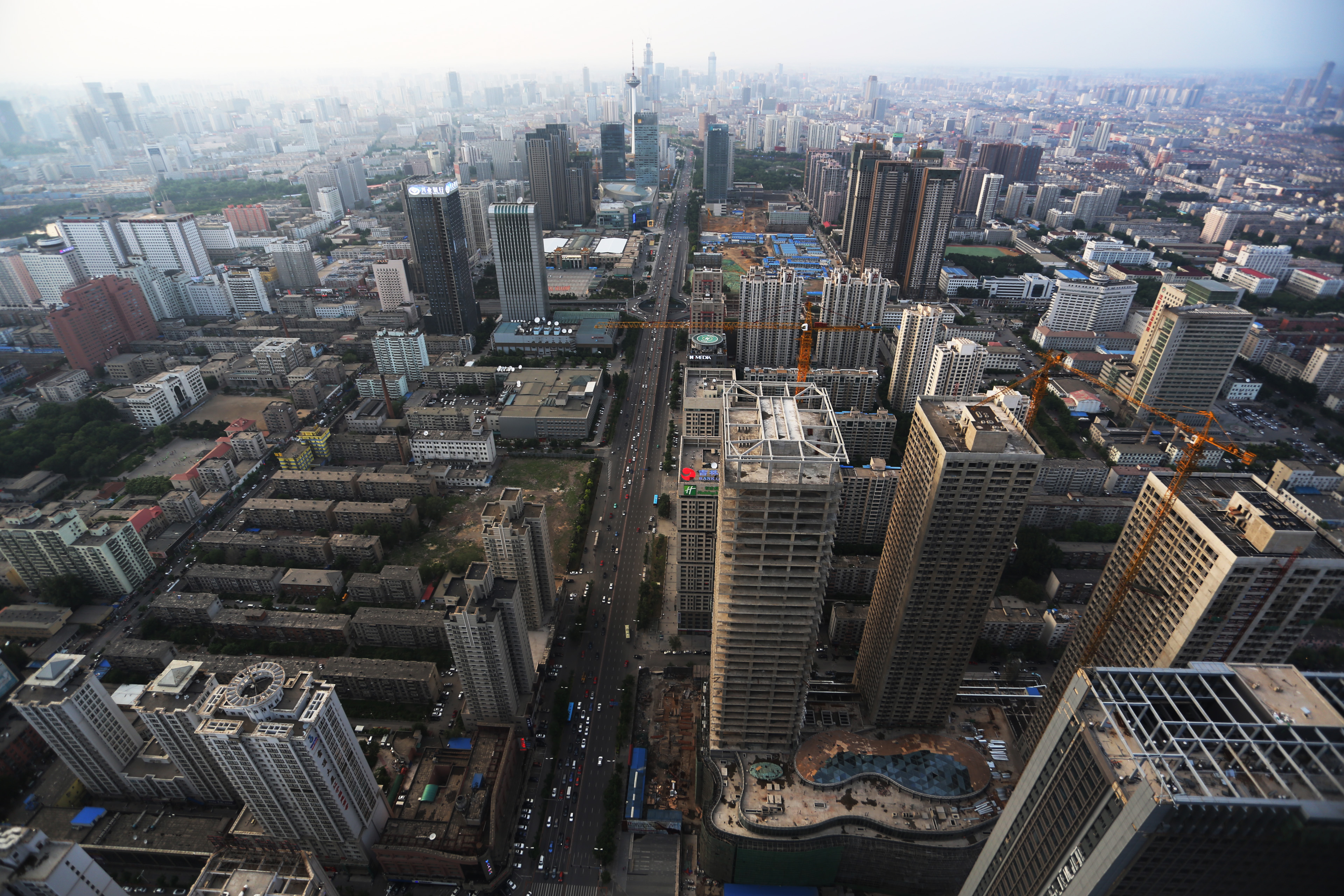
- Buildings along Qingnian Street in southern Shenhe District

- Location in Liaoning
- Coordinates: 41°47′53″N 123°30′09″E
- Country: China
- Province: Liaoning
- Sub-provincial city: Shenyang
- District seat: Huangcheng Subdistrict

Area
  - Total: 60 km^{2} (23 sq mi)

Population (2020 census)
  - Total: 782,628
  - Density: 13,000/km^{2} (34,000/sq mi)
- Time zone: UTC+8 (China Standard)
- Postal code: 110011~110016
- Website: www.shenhe.gov.cn

Shenhe, Shenyang
- Simplified Chinese: 沈河区
- Traditional Chinese: 瀋河區
- Literal meaning: Shen River
Transcriptions
Standard Mandarin
- Hanyu Pinyin: Shěnhé Qū

The Shenhe District (Chinese: 沈河区; pinyin: Shěnhé Qū) is one of ten districts of Shenyang, the capital of Liaoning province and the largest urban center in Northeast China. Shenhe District is where Shenyang's old city (within the long-demolished city walls) resided, currently serves as one of the two central districts of Shenyang (along with Heping District) and hosts the seat of the City Government. It borders the Dadong District to the northeast, Hunnan District to the south, Heping District to the west, and Huanggu District to the northwest.

== Administrative subdivisions ==
There are 11 subdistricts within the district.

- Binhe Subdistrict (滨河街道)
- Wanlian Subdistrict (万莲街道)
- Zhujianlu Subdistrict (朱剪炉街道)
- Beizhan Subdistrict (北站街道)
- Fengyutan Subdistrict (风雨坛街道)
- Huangcheng Subdistrict (皇城街道)
- Wulihe Subdistrict (五里河街道)
- Nanta Subdistrict (南塔街道)
- Quanyuan Subdistrict (泉园街道)
- Maguanqiao Subdistrict (马官桥街道)
- Dongling Subdistrict (东陵街道)

== Transport ==
=== Rail ===
Shenhe District is also home to Northeast China's main railway hub, the Shenyang North Railway Station (locally known as the "North Station"). The railways leading to the station forms the border between Shenhe District and the neighbouring eastern portion of Huanggu District. The station building has recently undergone a major overhaul and extension.

=== Road ===
Qingnian Street (Chinese: 青年大街; pinyin: Qīngnián Dà Jiē; lit. 'Youth Avenue') is the district's primary north–south arterial road that links Beiling Park and Taoxian Airport, separating the southern portion of Shenhe District from the neighbouring southern Heping District.

== Education ==
The Shenyang Saturday School (Chinese: 沈阳补习授业校; Shěnyáng bǔxí shòu yè xiào, Japanese: 瀋陽補習授業校; Shenyan Hoshū Jugyō Kō), a Japanese weekend school, was established in April 2006 and is located in Shenhe District.

== Visitor attractions ==
There is the Central Temple (中心庙; Zhōngxīn Mìao), built during the Ming dynasty, showing the center of ancient Shenyang. This temple is located just south of the Middle Street (中街; Zhōng Jiē), one of the most famous shopping streets and the first commercial pedestrian zone in China. Shenhe District is also home to the famous Wu'ai Market (五爱市场; Wŭài Shìchǎng), the largest light industry wholesale trading center in the entire Bohai Economic Rim.

Shenhe District is the site of the Mukden Palace, just south of the Central Temple. It is also the site of Zhang Zuolin's former home and headquarters, Shengjing Ancient Cultural Street. In the western Shenhe District there is a Muslim town, and the South Pagoda (南塔; Nán tǎ) is located in southern Shenhe District. There are a lot of high-end hotels located in Shenhe District, such as Sheraton, Kempinski, Lexington, Marriott (which is the first Marriott Hotel directly named "Marriott" in mainland China, but due to finance conflicts is not administrated by Marriott International). The iconic 305.5 m (1,002 ft) Liaoning Broadcast and TV Tower is situated alongside Qingnian Street.
