= Dadong, Shenyang =

Dadong 大东区
- District
- Location in Liaoning
- Coordinates: 41°51′43″N 123°30′36″E
- Country: People's Republic of China
- Province: Liaoning
- Sub-provincial city: Shenyang

Area
  - Total: 100 km^{2} (39 sq mi)

Population (2020 census)
  - Total: 754,952
  - Density: 7,500/km^{2} (20,000/sq mi)
- Time zone: UTC+8 (China Standard)
- Postal code: 11004X
- Area code: 024
- Website: www.sydd.gov.cn

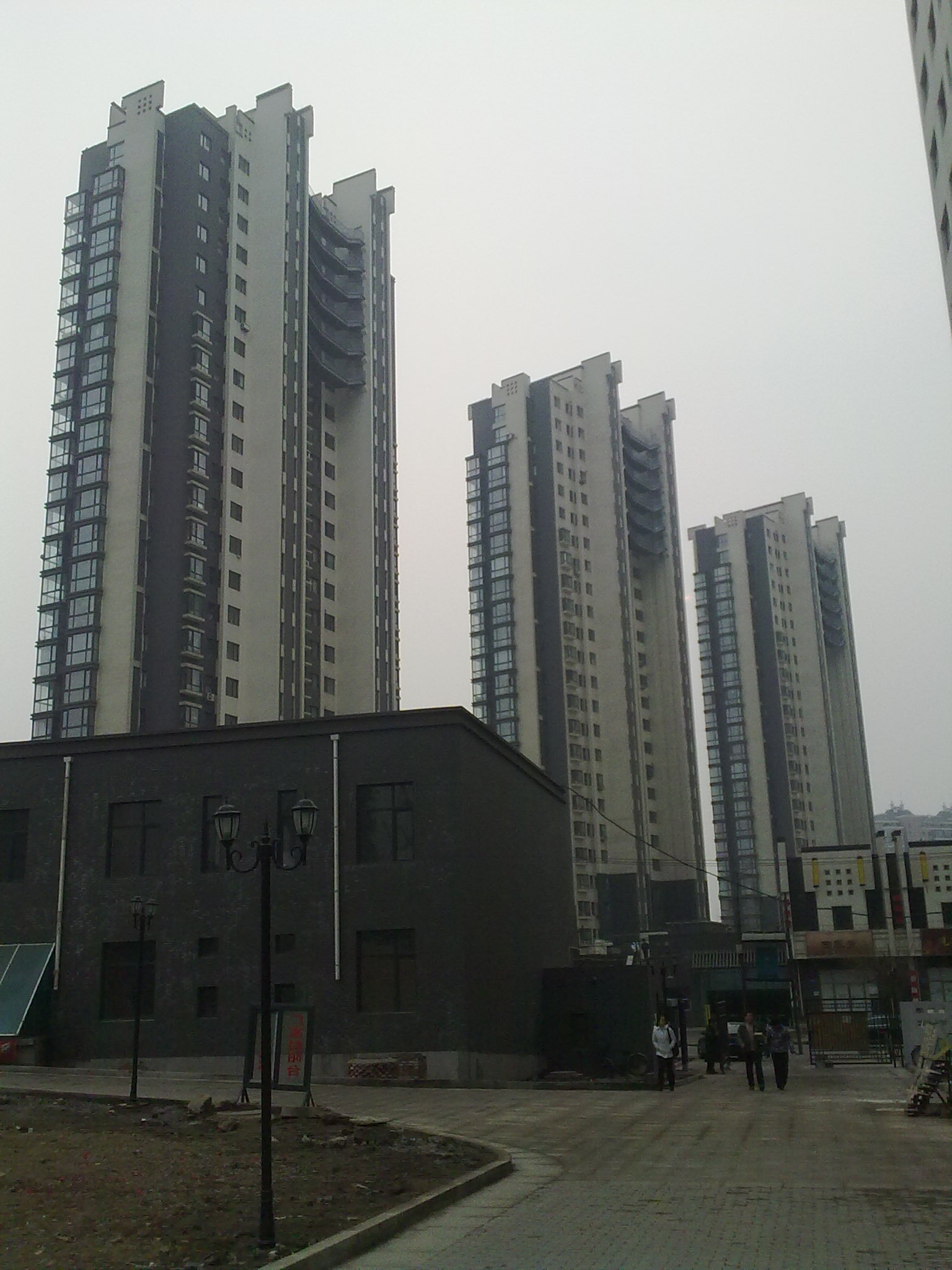
Panorama of the Dadong district

Dadong District (Chinese: 大东区; pinyin: Dàdōng Qū) is one of ten districts of the prefecture-level city of Shenyang, the capital of the Chinese province of Liaoning. It borders Shenbei New Area to the north, Dongling to the east, Shenhe to the south, and Huanggu to the west.

Dadong, Shenyang
- Simplified Chinese: 大东区
- Traditional Chinese: 大東區
- Literal meaning: Great East
Transcriptions
Standard Mandarin
- Hanyu Pinyin: Dàdōng Qū

== Toponymy ==
Its name derives from the fact that the district started off as the residential area immediately outside the old inner city wall's Fujin Gate (撫近門), which is also called Great East Gate (大東門).

== Administrative divisions ==
Dadong District has fifteen subdistricts:

- Wanquan Subdistrict (万泉街道)
- Guancheng Subdistrict (管城街道)
- Chang'an Subdistrict (长安街道)
- Dongta Subdistrict (东塔街道)
- Xindong Subdistrict (新东街道)
- Zhulin Subdistrict (珠林街道)
- Xiaodong Subdistrict (小东街道)
- Xiaojinqiao Subdistrict (小津桥街道)
- Dabei Subdistrict (大北街道)
- Xiaobei Subdistrict (小北街道)
- Taochang Subdistrict (洮昌街道)
- Liaoshen Subdistrict (辽沈街道)
- Dongzhan Subdistrict (东站街道)
- Ertaizi Subdistrict (二台子街道)
- Wenguan Subdistrict (文官街道)

== Transport ==
The oldest airfield in Shenyang, the now-defunct East Pagoda Airport, is located in Dadong District. It was the headquarters of the defunct China Northern Airlines.

== Tourist attractions ==
The district contains popular tourist landmarks such as the 9.18 Historical Museum, the North and East Pagodas, Bawang Temple and the Wanquan Park.

Lianhe arcade, the last amusement arcade in the city, is located in this district.

== Education ==
The Shenyang University is located in Dadong. The Shangpin schools, which enrolls students from Grades 1-9, consistently ranks among the top public schools in Shenyang.
