= Yuhong, Shenyang =

Yuhong 于洪区
- District
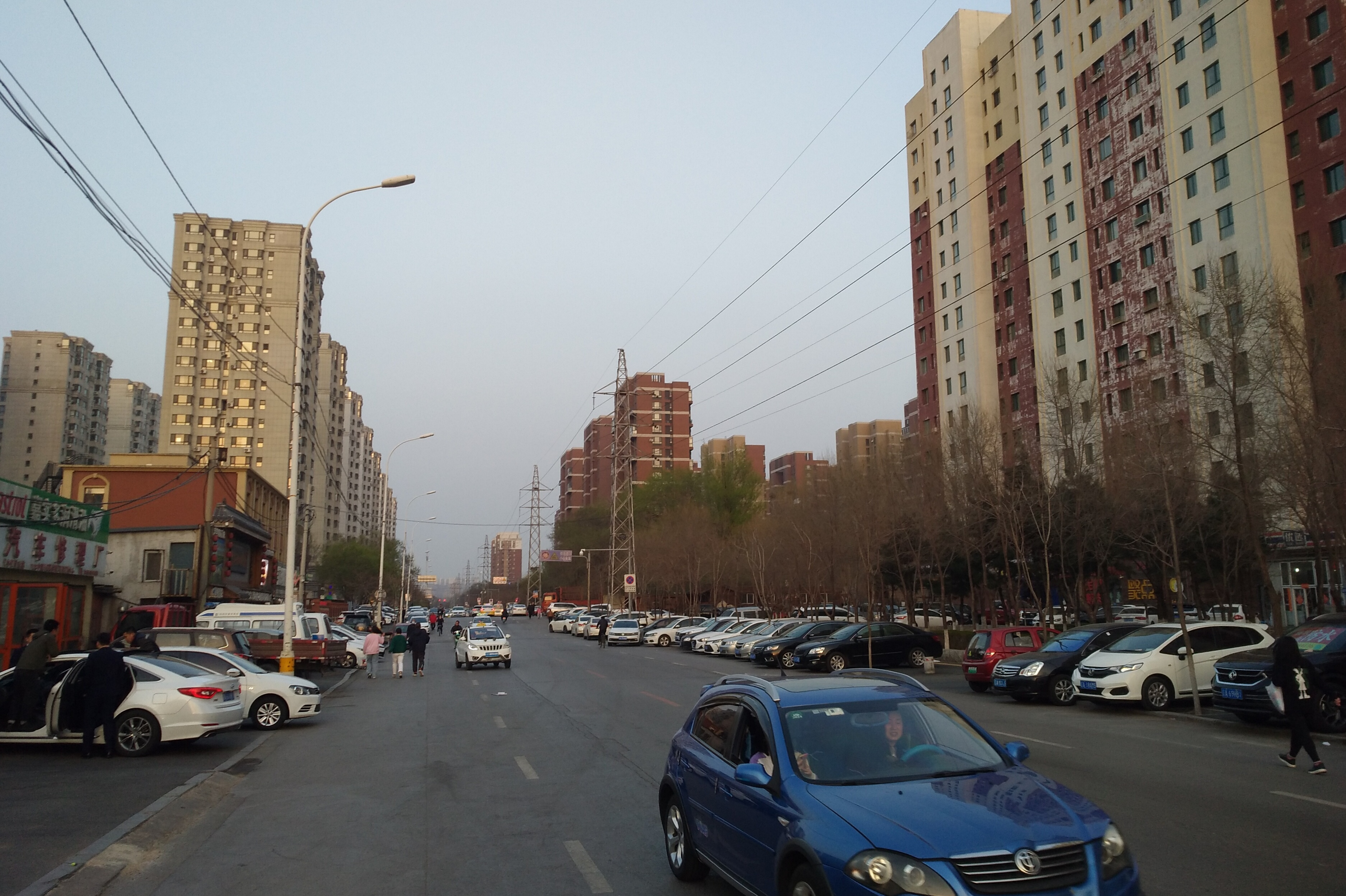

- Location in Liaoning
- Coordinates: 41°53′38″N 123°15′56″E
- Country: People's Republic of China
- Province: Liaoning
- Sub-provincial city: Shenyang

Area
  - Total: 499 km^{2} (193 sq mi)

Population (2020)
  - Total: 1,066,062
  - Density: 2,140/km^{2} (5,530/sq mi)
- Time zone: UTC+8 (China Standard)
- Postal code: 210114
- Area code: 0024

Yuhong District (simplified Chinese: 于洪区; traditional Chinese: 于洪區; pinyin: Yúhóng Qū) is one of ten districts of the prefecture-level city of Shenyang, the capital of Liaoning Province, Northeast China, and forms part of the northwestern and western suburbs. It borders Shenbei New Area to the northeast, Huanggu District to the east, Sujiatun District to the south, and Xinmin City to the west; in addition, Tiexi District also lies in between the two parts of Yuhong.

== Economy ==
China Resources Beverage, the distributor of C'estbon water, has its northeast regional office in the district.

== Administrative divisions ==
Subdistricts:

- Yingbin Road Subdistrict (迎宾路街道), Shenliao Road Subdistrict (沈辽路街道), Lingxi Subdistrict (陵西街道), Beita Subdistrict (北塔街道), Yuhong Subdistrict (于洪街道), Yangshi Subdistrict (杨士街道), Beiling Subdistrict (北陵街道), Lingdong Subdistrict (陵东街道), Shaling Subdistrict (沙岭街道)

Towns:

- Masanjia (马三家镇), Pingluo (平罗镇), Dapan (大潘镇), Zhaijia (翟家镇), Zaohua (造化镇), Zhangyizhan (彰驿站镇), Gaohua (高花镇)

Townships:

- Lingdong Township (陵东乡), Guanghui Township (光辉乡), Daqing Sino-Korean Friendship Township (大青中朝友谊乡), Daxing Korean Ethnic Township (大兴朝鲜族乡)
