= Dingxianghu station =

Shenyang Metro station

Dingxianghu 丁香湖 metro
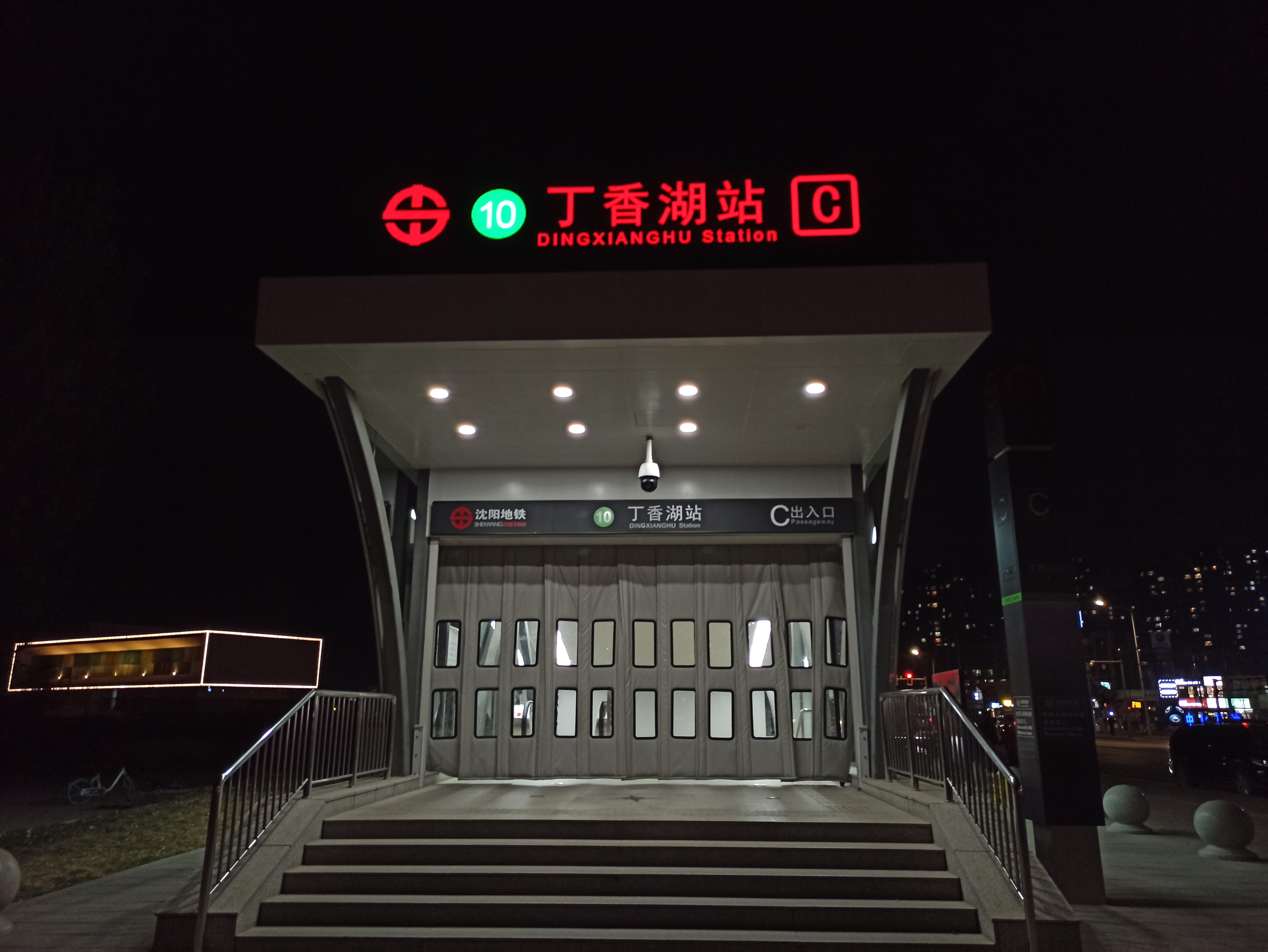

General information
- Location: Yuanjiang St. Yuhong District, Shenyang, Liaoning; China
- Coordinates: 41°51′41″N 123°20′32″E
- Operator: Shenyang Metro
- Line: Line 10
- Platforms: 2

Construction
- Structure type: Underground
- Accessible: Yes

History
- Opened: 29 April 2020; 6 years ago

Services
Preceding station	Shenyang Metro	Following station
Terminus	Line 10	Yuanjiangjie towards Zhangshabu
Location

Dingxianghu (Chinese: 丁香湖站; pinyin: Dīngxiānghú Zhàn) is a station on Line 10 of the Shenyang Metro. The station opened on 29 April 2020.

== Station Layout ==
G	Entrances and Exits	Exits A-D
B1	Concourse	Faregates, Station Agent
B2	Northbound	← Line 10 termination track
B2	Island platform, doors open on the left
B2	Southbound	Line 10 towards Zhangshabu (Yuanjiangjie) →
