= Zhangshabu station =

Shenyang Metro station

Zhangshabu 张沙布 metro
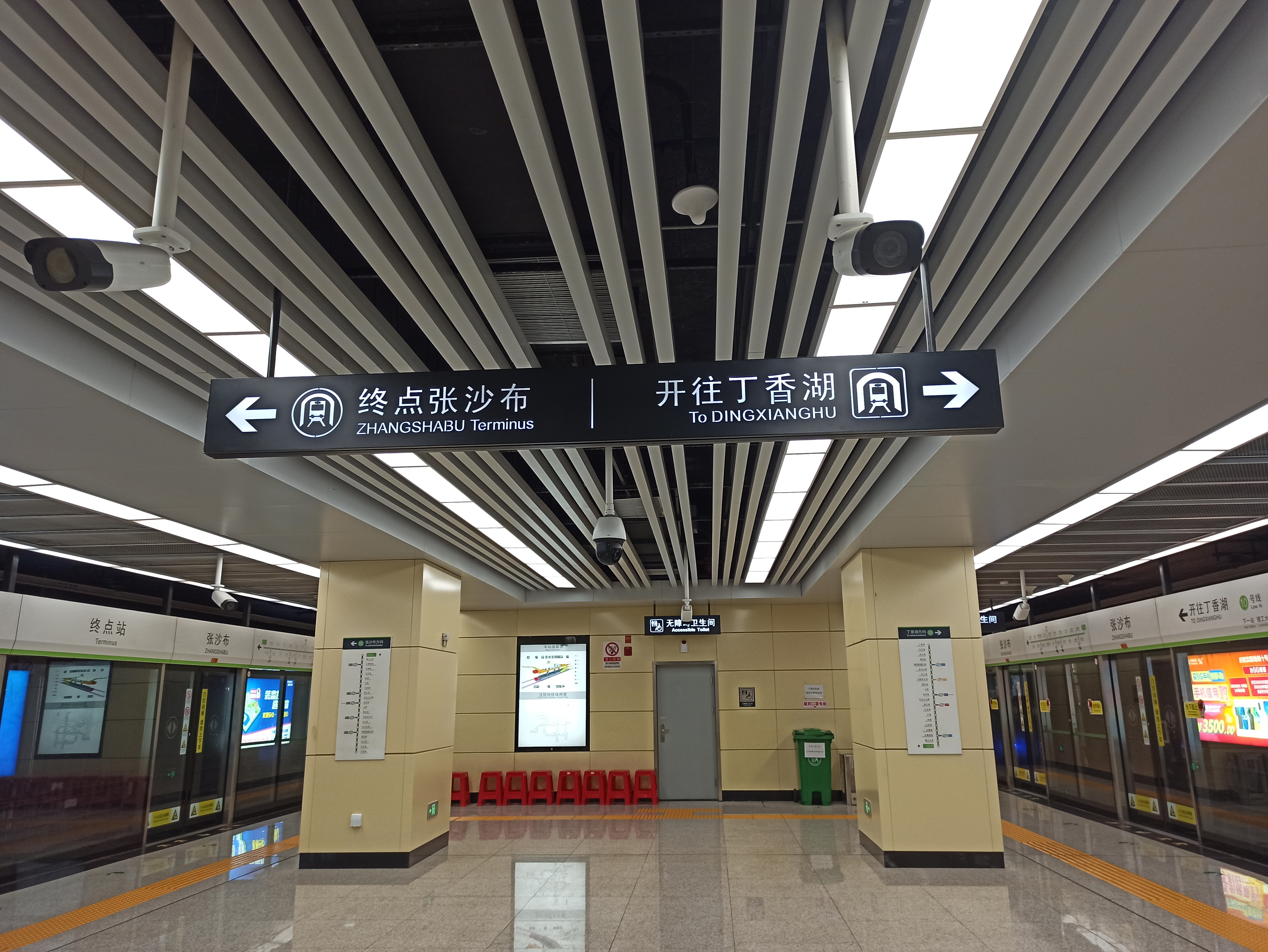

General information
- Location: Shenli Highway; Hunnan District, Shenyang, Liaoning; China
- Coordinates: 41.71825°N 123.508°E
- Operator: Shenyang Metro
- Line: Line 10
- Platforms: 2

Construction
- Structure type: Underground
- Accessible: Yes

History
- Opened: 29 April 2020; 6 years ago

Services
Preceding station	Shenyang Metro	Following station
Ligongdaxue towards Dingxianghu	Line 10	Terminus
Location

Zhangshabu (Chinese: 张沙布站; pinyin: Zhāngshābù Zhàn) is a station and the southern terminus on Line 10 of the Shenyang Metro. The station opened on 29 April 2020.

== Station Layout ==
G	Entrances and Exits	Exits A-D
B1	Concourse	Faregates, Station Agent
B2	Northbound	← Line 10 towards Dingxianghu (Ligongdaxue)
B2	Island platform, doors open on the left
B2	Southbound	Line 10 termination track →
