= Caixiajie station =

Metro station in Liaoning, China

Caixiajie 彩霞街 metro
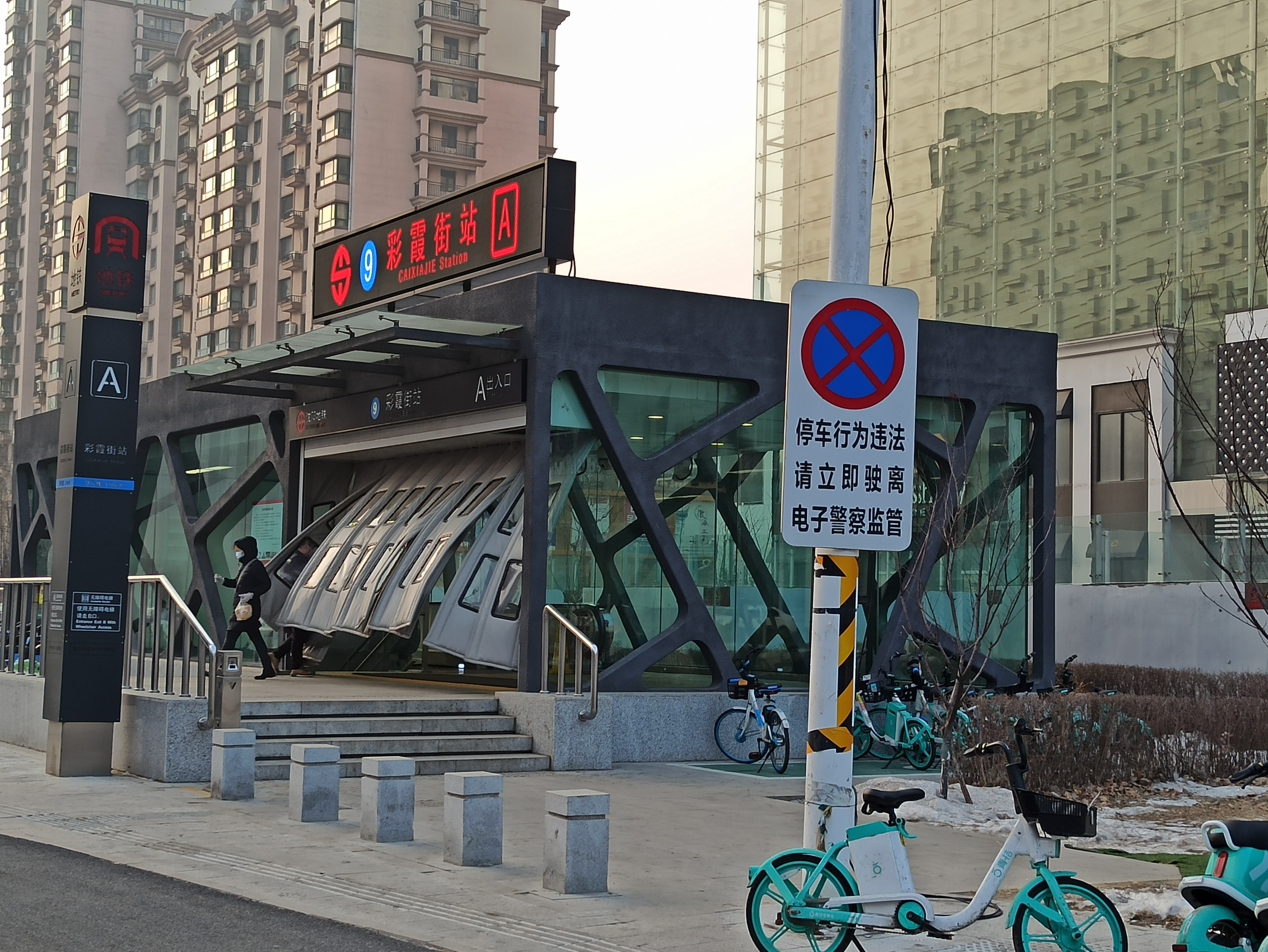

General information
- Location: Intersection of Hunnan Rd. and Jiahe St. Hunnan District, Shenyang, Liaoning; China
- Coordinates: 41.7317°N 123.4352°E
- Operator: Shenyang Metro
- Line: Line 9
- Platforms: 2

Construction
- Structure type: Underground
- Accessible: Yes

History
- Opened: 25 May 2019; 7 years ago

Services
| Preceding station | Shenyang Metro | Following station |
|---|---|---|
| Jinyangdajie towards Nujianggongyuan | Line 9 | Tianchengjie towards Jianzhudaxue |
Location

Caixiajie (Chinese: 彩霞街站; pinyin: Cǎixiájiē Zhàn) is a station on Line 9 of the Shenyang Metro. The station opened on 25 May 2019.

== Station Layout ==
| G | Entrances and Exits | Exits A-D |
| B1 | Concourse | Faregates, Station Agent |
| B2 | Northbound | ← Line 9 towards Nujianggongyuan (Jinyangdajie) |
| B2 | Island platform, doors open on the left |
| B2 | Southbound | Line 9 towards Jianzhudaxue (Aotizhongxin) → |
