= Beierlu station =

Shenyang Metro station

Beierlu 北二路 metro
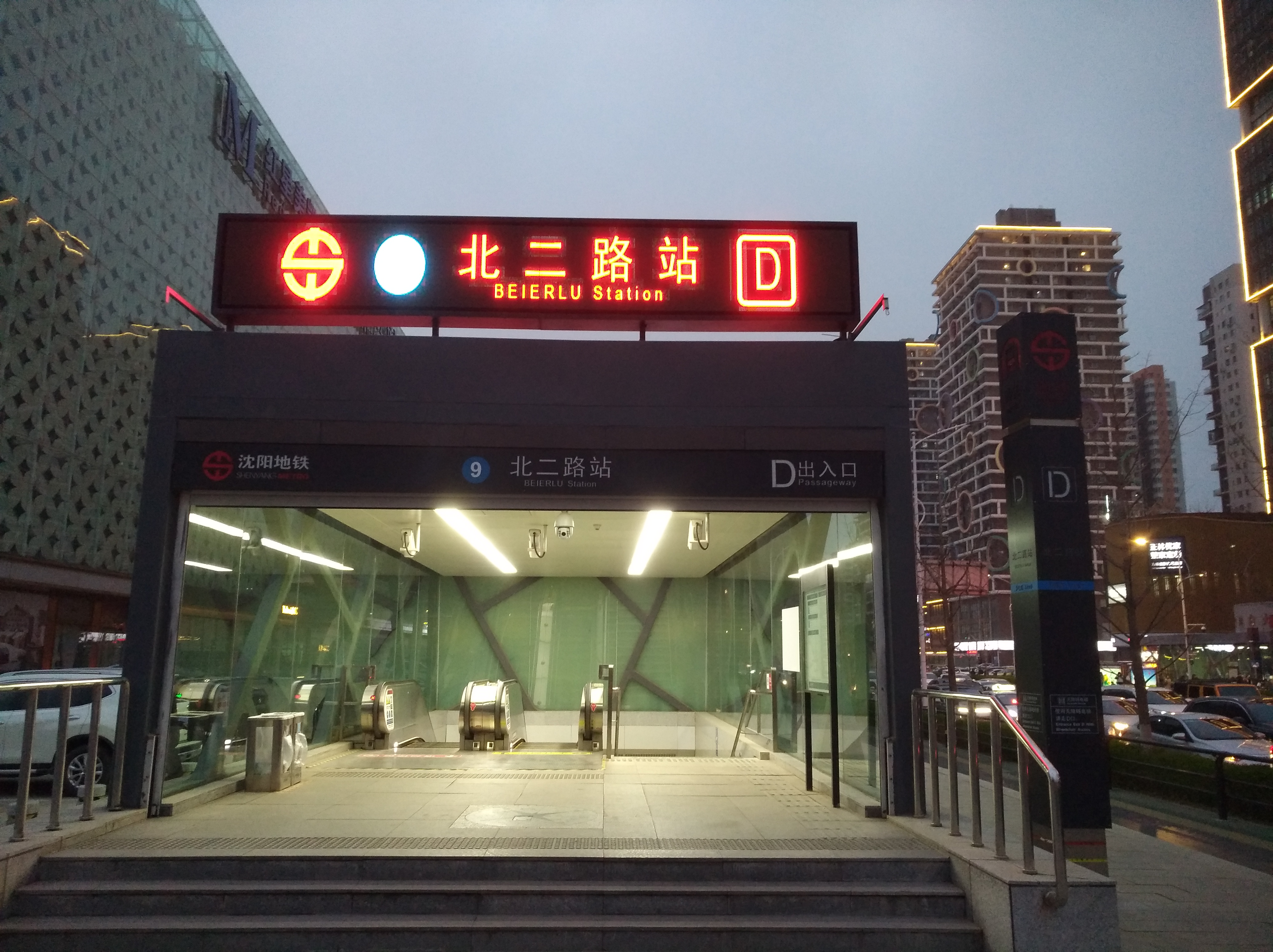

General information
- Location: Intersection of Beier Rd. and Xinghua North St. Tiexi District, Shenyang, Liaoning; China
- Coordinates: 41.80269°N 123.37301°E
- Operator: Shenyang Metro
- Line: Line 9
- Platforms: 2 (1 island platform)

Construction
- Structure type: Underground
- Accessible: Yes

History
- Opened: 25 May 2019; 7 years ago

Services
Preceding station	Shenyang Metro	Following station
Zhongxingwenhuaguangchang towards Nujianggongyuan	Line 9	Tiexiguangchang towards Jianzhudaxue
Location

Beierlu station (Chinese: 北二路站; pinyin: Běièrlù Zhàn; lit. 'North 2nd Road station') is a station on Line 9 of the Shenyang Metro. The station opened on 25 May 2019.

== Station Layout ==
G	Entrances and Exits	Exits A-C
B1	Concourse	Faregates, Station Agent
B2	Northbound	← Line 9 towards Nujianggongyuan (Zhongxingwenhuaguangchang)
B2	Island platform, doors open on the left
B2	Southbound	Line 9 towards Jianzhudaxue (Tiexiguangchang) →
