= Huaxiang station =

Shenyang Metro station

Huaxiang 滑翔 metro
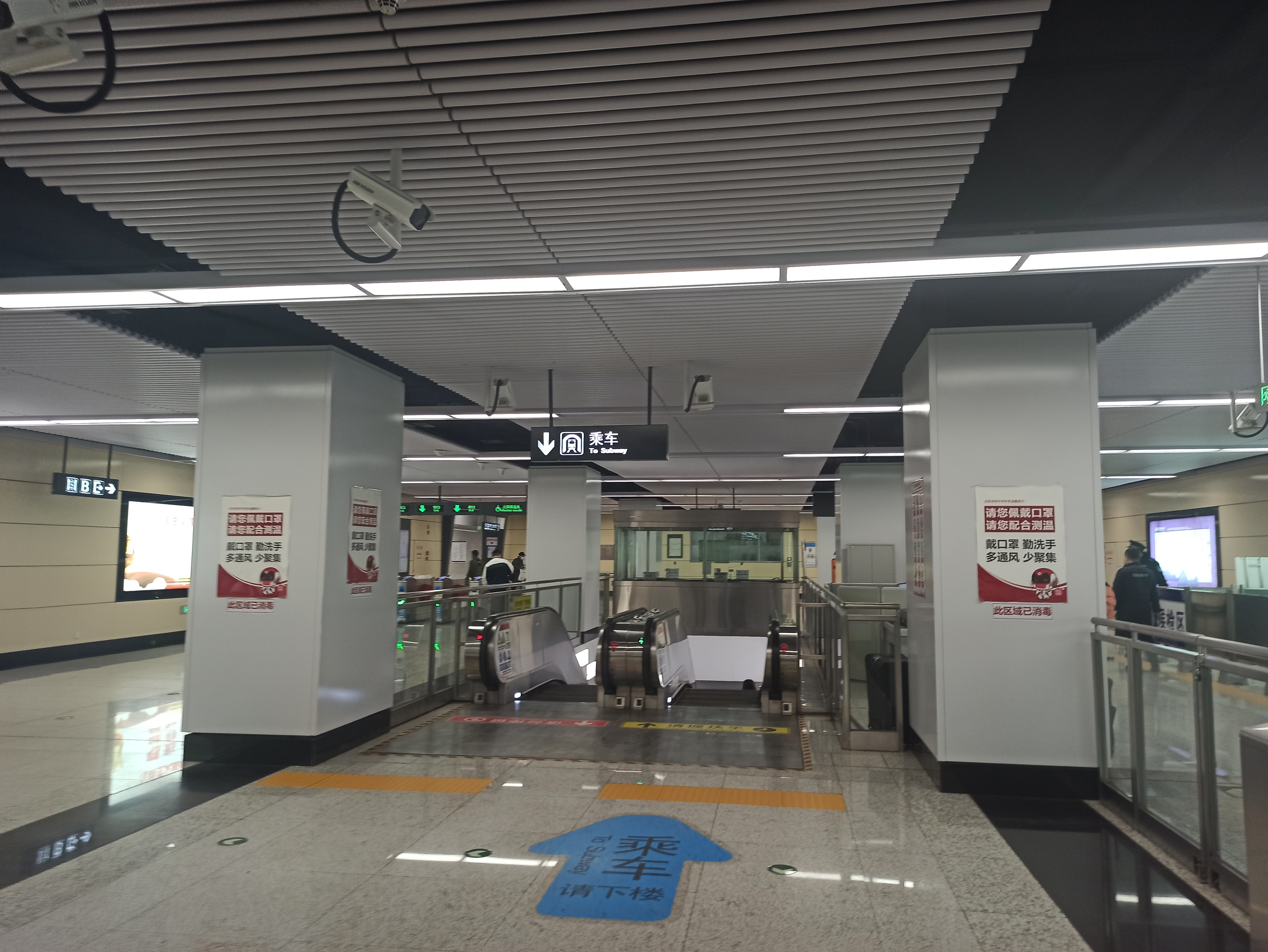

General information
- Location: Intersection of Tengfeier St. and Nanhuaxiang Rd. Tiexi District, Shenyang, Liaoning; China
- Operator: Shenyang Metro
- Line: Line 9
- Platforms: 2

Construction
- Structure type: Underground
- Accessible: Yes

History
- Opened: 25 May 2019; 7 years ago

Services
Preceding station	Shenyang Metro	Following station
Shenliaolu towards Nujianggongyuan	Line 9	Jilihujie towards Jianzhudaxue
Location

Huaxiang (Chinese: 滑翔站; pinyin: Huáxiáng Zhàn) is a station on Line 9 of the Shenyang Metro. The station opened on 25 May 2019.

== Station Layout ==
G	Entrances and Exits	Exits B-C
B1	Concourse	Faregates, Station Agent
B2	Mezzanine
B3	Northbound	← Line 9 towards Nujianggongyuan (Shenliaolu)
B3	Island platform, doors open on the left
B3	Southbound	Line 9 towards Jianzhudaxue (Jilihujie) →
