= Shenliaolu station =

Shenyang Metro station

Shenliaolu 沈辽路 metro

General information
- Location: Intersection of Shenliao Rd. and Xinghua South St. Tiexi District, Shenyang, Liaoning; China
- Operator: Shenyang Metro
- Line: Line 9
- Platforms: 2

Construction
- Structure type: Underground
- Accessible: Yes

History
- Opened: 25 May 2019; 7 years ago

Services
Preceding station	Shenyang Metro	Following station
Xinghuagongyuan towards Nujianggongyuan	Line 9	Huaxiang towards Jianzhudaxue
Location

Shenliaolu (Chinese: 沈辽路站; pinyin: Shénliáolù Zhàn) is a station on Line 9 of the Shenyang Metro. The station opened on 25 May 2019.

== Station Layout ==
G	Entrances and Exits	Exits A-B
B1	Concourse	Faregates, Station Agent
B2	Northbound	← Line 9 towards Nujianggongyuan (Xinghuagongyuan)
B2	Island platform, doors open on the left
B2	Southbound	Line 9 towards Jianzhudaxue (Huaxiang) →
