= Aotizhongxin station =

Shenyang Metro interchange station

Aotizhongxin 奥体中心
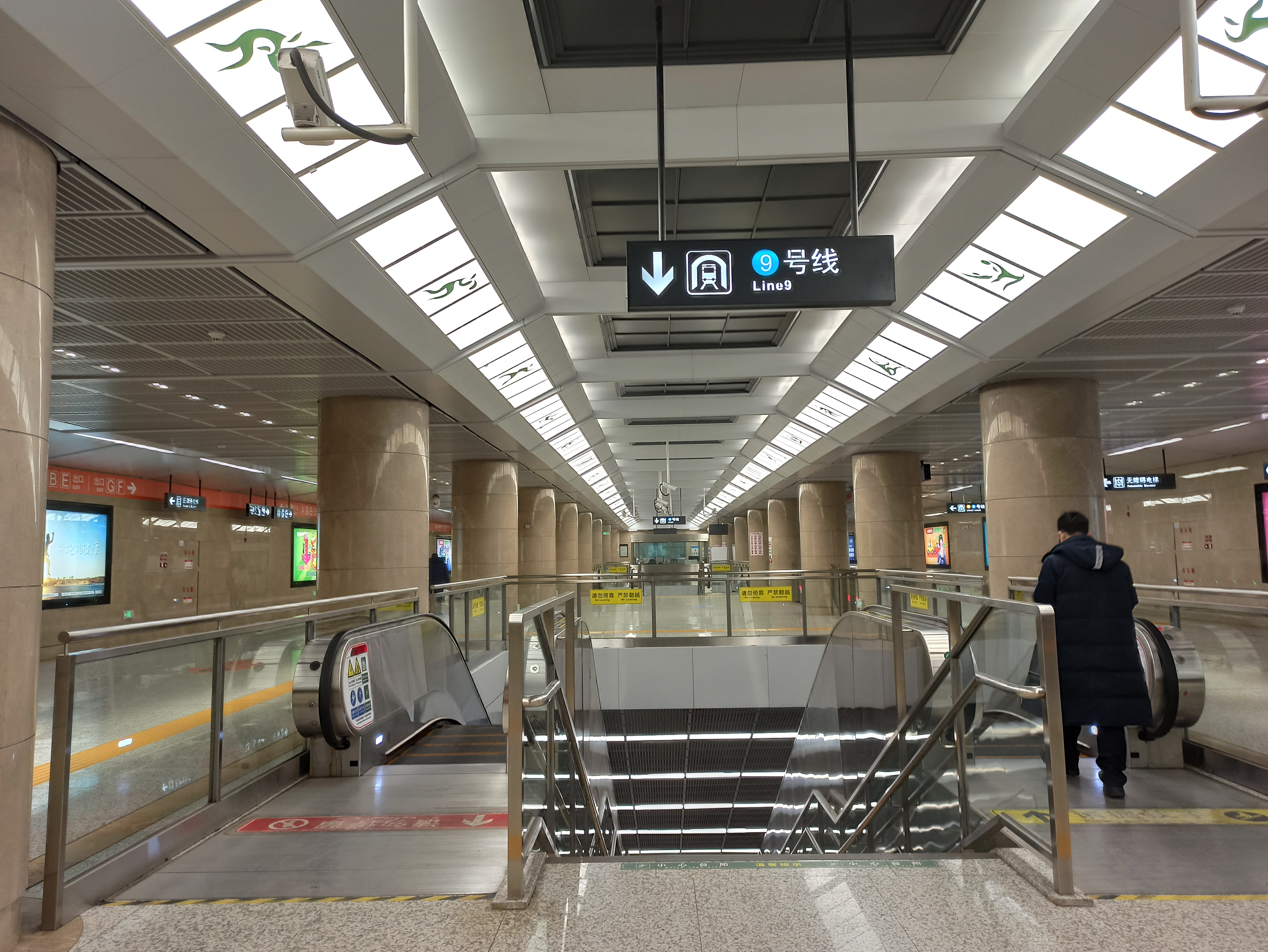
- Station concourse

General information
- Location: Intersection of Jiangshe Rd. and Xinghua St. Hunnan District, Shenyang, Liaoning; China
- Coordinates: 41°43′52″N 123°27′24″E
- Operator: Shenyang Metro
- Lines: Line 2 Line 9
- Platforms: 4

Construction
- Structure type: Underground
- Accessible: Yes

Other information
- Station code: L2/05

History
- Opened: 30 December 2011; 14 years ago (Line 2); 25 May 2019; 7 years ago (Line 9)

Services
Preceding station	Shenyang Metro	Following station
Wulihe towards Putianlu	Line 2	Yingpanjie towards Taoxianjichang
Caixiajie towards Nujianggongyuan	Line 9	Tianchengjie towards Jianzhudaxue
Location

Aotizhongxin (Chinese: 奥体中心站; pinyin: Àotǐzhōngxīn Zhàn) is an interchange station on lines 2 and 9 of the Shenyang Metro. The Line 2 station opened on 30 December 2011, and the Line 9 station opened on 25 May 2019.

== Station Layout ==
G	Entrances and Exits	Exits A-G
B1	Concourse	Faregates, Station Agent
B2	Northbound	← Line 2 towards Putianlu (Wulihe)
B2	Island platform, doors open on the left
B2	Southbound	Line 2 towards Taoxianjichang (Yingpanjie) →
B3	Northbound	← Line 9 towards Nujianggongyuan (Caixiajie)
B3	Island platform, doors open on the left
B3	Southbound	Line 9 towards Jianzhudaxue (Tianchengjie) →
