= Langrijie station =

Shenyang Metro station

Langrijie 朗日街
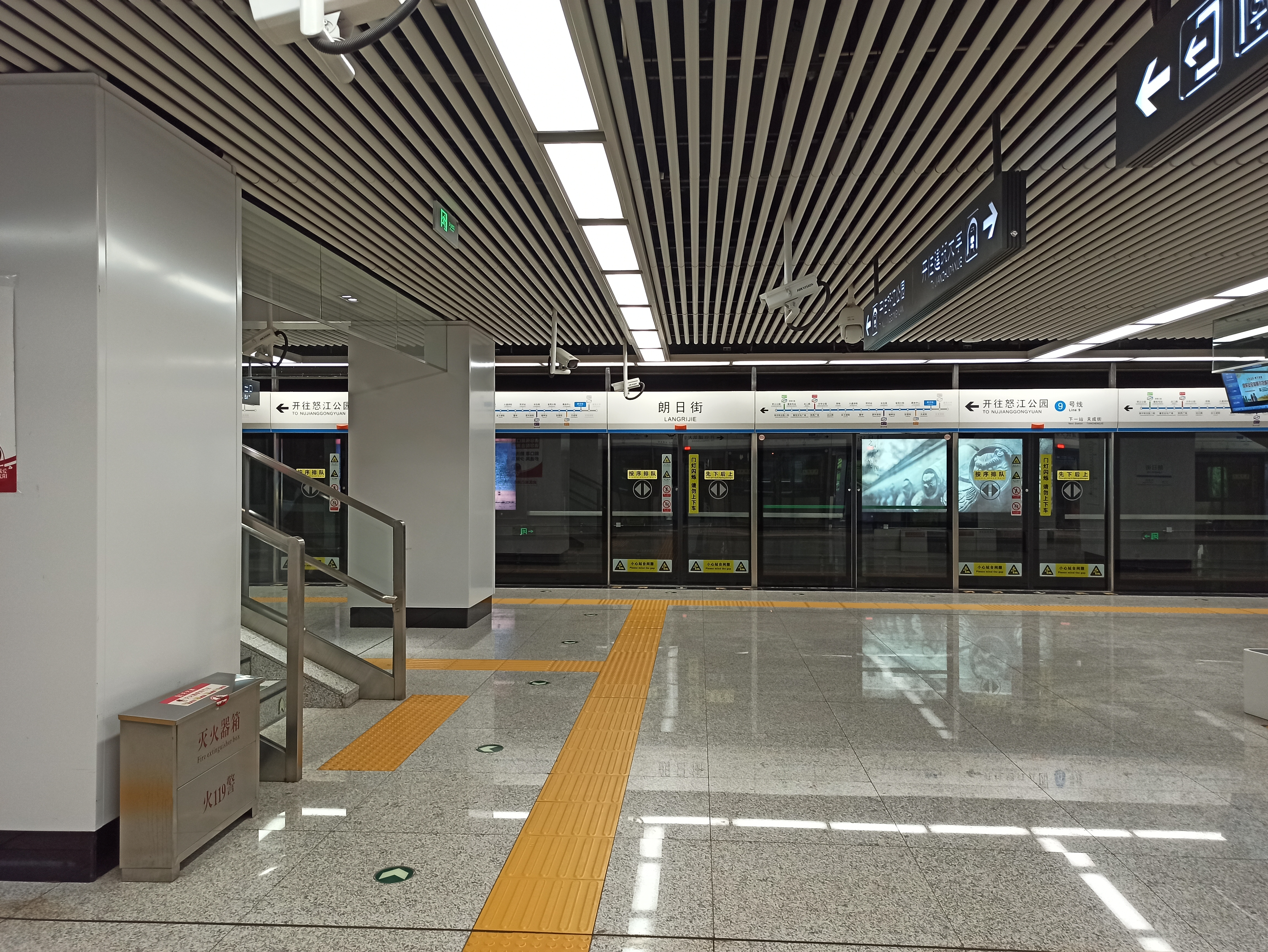

General information
- Location: Intersection of Hunnan Rd. and Langri St. Hunnan District, Shenyang, Liaoning; China
- Coordinates: 41.7388°N 123.4787°E
- Operator: Shenyang Metro
- Line: Line 9
- Platforms: 2

Construction
- Structure type: Underground
- Accessible: Yes

History
- Opened: 25 May 2019; 7 years ago

Services
Preceding station	Shenyang Metro	Following station
Tianchengjie towards Nujianggongyuan	Line 9	Changqingnanjie towards Jianzhudaxue
Location

Langrijie (Chinese: 朗日街站; pinyin: Lǎngrìjiē Zhàn) is a station on Line 9 of the Shenyang Metro. The station opened on 25 May 2019.

== Station Layout ==
G	Entrances and Exits	Exits A-D
B1	Concourse	Faregates, Station Agent
B2	Northbound	← Line 9 towards Nujianggongyuan (Tianchengjie)
B2	Island platform, doors open on the left
B2	Southbound	Line 9 towards Jianzhudaxue (Changqingnanjie) →
