= Tiexiguangchang station =

Shenyang Metro interchange station

Tiexiguangchang 铁西广场 metro
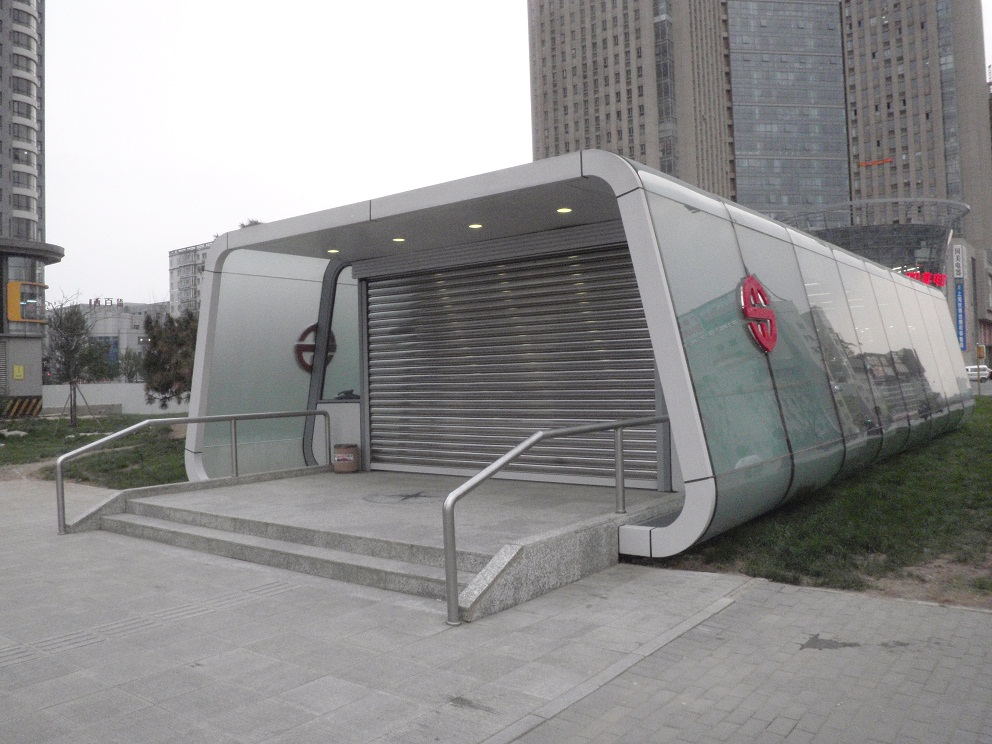
- One of the entrances

General information
- Location: Intersection of Jiangshe Rd. and Xinghua St. Tiexi District, Shenyang, Liaoning; China
- Coordinates: 41°47′40″N 123°22′13″E
- Operator: Shenyang Metro
- Lines: Line 1 Line 9
- Platforms: 4

Construction
- Structure type: Underground
- Accessible: Yes

Other information
- Station code: L1/11 (Line 1)

History
- Opened: 27 September 2010; 15 years ago (line 1); 25 May 2019; 7 years ago (line 9)

Services
Preceding station	Shenyang Metro	Following station
Baogongjie towards Shisanhaojie	Line 1	Yunfengbeijie towards Shuangma
Beierlu towards Nujianggongyuan	Line 9	Xinghuagongyuan towards Jianzhudaxue
Location

Tiexiguangchang (Chinese: 铁西广场站; pinyin: Tiěxīguǎngchǎng Zhàn) is an interchange station on lines 1 and 9 of the Shenyang Metro. The line 1 station opened on 27 September 2010, and the line 9 station opened on 25 May 2019.

== Station Layout ==
G	Entrances and Exits	Exits A-H
B1	Concourse	Faregates, Station Agent
B2	Westbound	← Line 1 towards Shisanhaojie (Baogongjie)
B2	Island platform, doors open on the left
B2	Eastbound	Line 1 towards Shuangma (Yunfengbeijie) →
B3	Northbound	← Line 9 towards Nujianggongyuan (Beierlu)
B3	Island platform, doors open on the left
B3	Southbound	Line 9 towards Jianzhudaxue (Xinghuagongyuan) →
