= Xinghuagongyuan station =

Shenyang Metro station

Xinghuagongyuan 兴华公园 metro

General information
- Location: Intersection of Xinghua South St. and Nanba Rd. Tiexi District, Shenyang, Liaoning; China
- Coordinates: 41.7849°N 123.35958°E
- Operator: Shenyang Metro
- Line: Line 9
- Platforms: 2

Construction
- Structure type: Underground
- Accessible: Yes

History
- Opened: 25 May 2019; 7 years ago

Services
| Preceding station | Shenyang Metro | Following station |
|---|---|---|
| Tiexiguangchang towards Nujianggongyuan | Line 9 | Shenliaolu towards Jianzhudaxue |
Location

Xinghuagongyuan (Chinese: 兴华公园站; pinyin: Xìnghuágōngyuán Zhàn) is a station on Line 9 of the Shenyang Metro. The station opened on 25 May 2019.

== Station Layout ==
| G | Entrances and Exits | Exits A-D |
| B1 | Concourse | Faregates, Station Agent |
| B2 | Side platform, doors open on the right |
| B2 | Northbound | ← Line 9 towards Nujianggongyuan (Tiexiguangchang) |
| B2 | Southbound | Line 9 towards Jianzhudaxue (Shenliaolu) → |
| B2 | Side platform, doors open on the right |
| B3 | Underpass |
