= Changbainan station =

Shenyang Metro station

Changbainan 长白南 metro
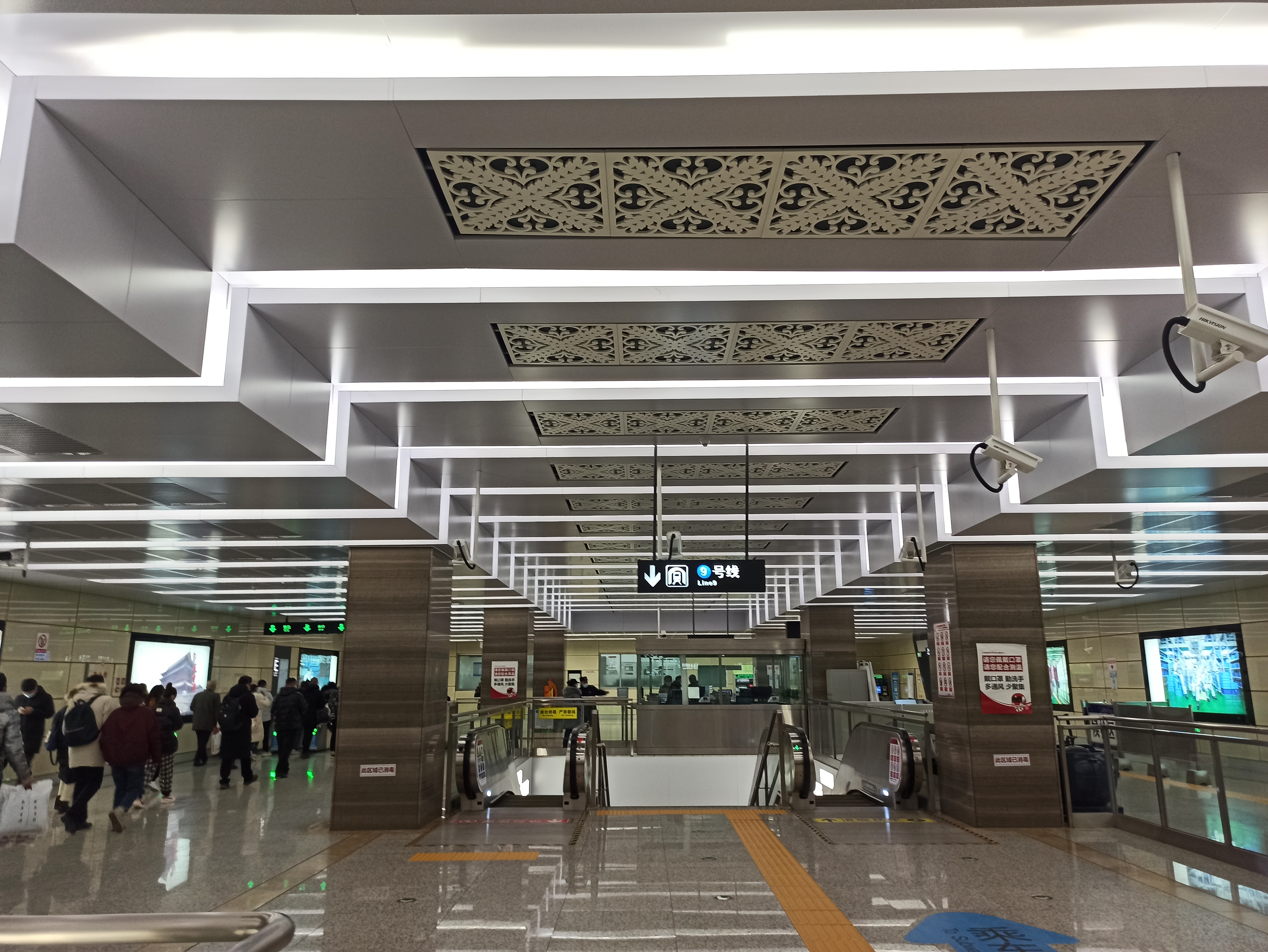

General information
- Location: Intersection of Nanjing South St. and Hunnan West Rd. Heping District, Shenyang, Liaoning; China
- Coordinates: 41.72477°N 123.40395°E
- Operator: Shenyang Metro
- Lines: Line 4 Line 9
- Platforms: 4 (2 island platforms)

Construction
- Structure type: Underground
- Accessible: Yes

History
- Opened: 25 May 2019; 7 years ago

Services
Preceding station	Shenyang Metro	Following station
Changbaidao towards Zhengxinlu	Line 4	Jincanglu towards Chuangxinlu
Shenglinanjie towards Nujianggongyuan	Line 9	Yushutai towards Jianzhudaxue
Location

Changbainan (Chinese: 长白南站; pinyin: Chángbáinán Zhàn) is a station on Line 4 and Line 9 of the Shenyang Metro. The station opened on 25 May 2019.

== Station Layout ==
G	Entrances and Exits	Exits A-C, E, G, H
B1	Concourse	Faregates, Station Agent
B2	Northbound	← Line 9 towards Nujianggongyuan (Shenglinanjie)
B2	Island platform, doors open on the left
B2	Southbound	Line 9 towards Jianzhudaxue (Yushutai) →
B3	Northbound	← Line 4 towards Zhengxinlu (Changbaidao)
B3	Island platform, doors open on the left
B3	Southbound	Line 4 towards Chuangxinlu (Jincanglu) →
