= Datonghujie station =

Shenyang Metro station

Datonghujie 大通湖街 metro
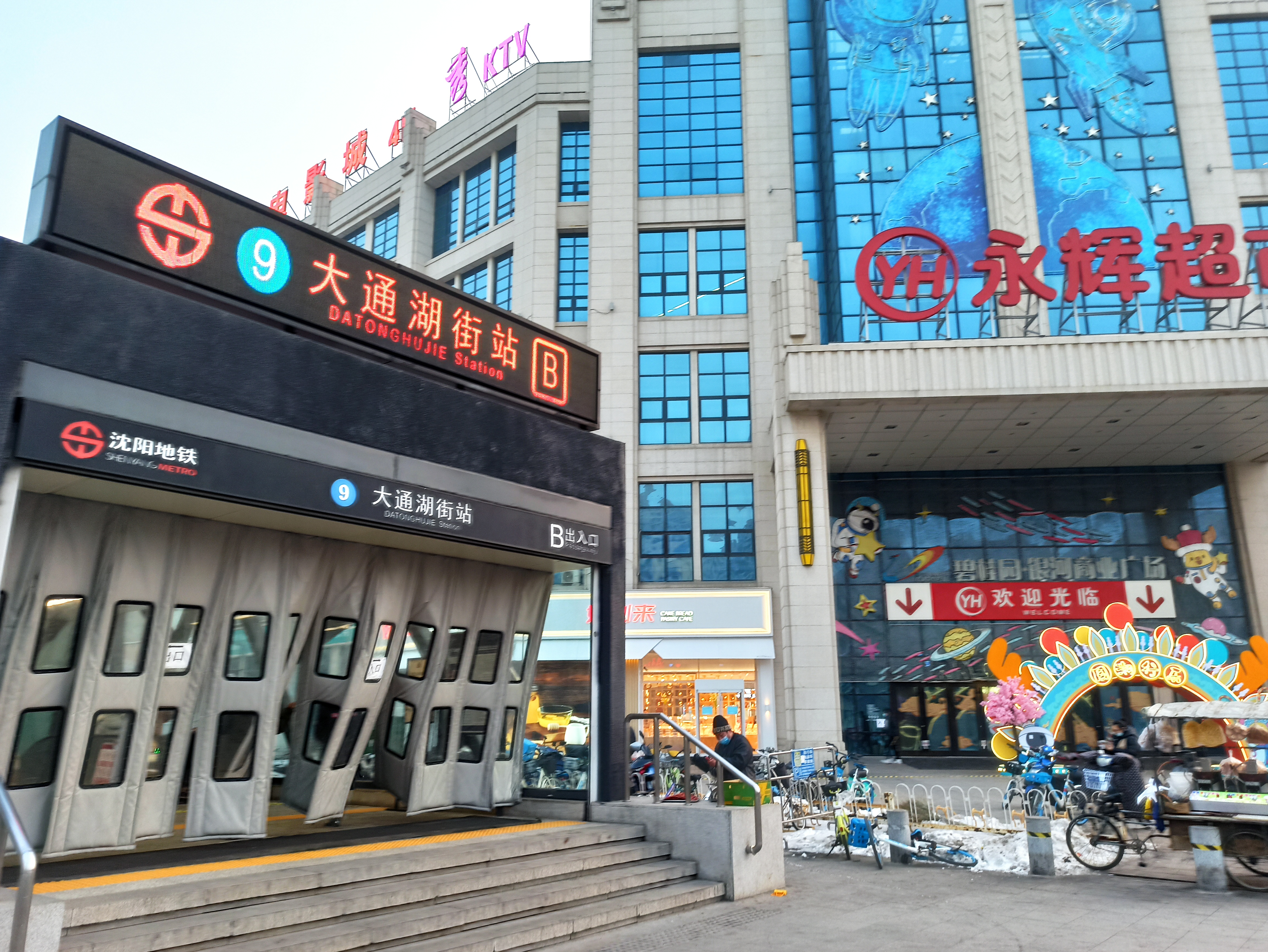
- Entrance B

General information
- Location: Intersection of Dahongtu St. and Wanghe Rd. Yuhong District, Shenyang, Liaoning; China
- Coordinates: 41.74939°N 123.34057°E
- Operator: Shenyang Metro
- Lines: Line 3 Line 9
- Platforms: 4 (2 island platforms)

Construction
- Structure type: Underground
- Accessible: Yes

History
- Opened: 25 May 2019; 7 years ago

Services
Preceding station	Shenyang Metro	Following station
Nanyanghujie towards Lida	Line 3	Nanliguan towards Fangjialan
Jilihujie towards Nujianggongyuan	Line 9	Caozhong towards Jianzhudaxue
Location

Datonghujie (Chinese: 大通湖街站; pinyin: Dàtōnghújiē Zhàn) is a station on Line 3 and Line 9 of the Shenyang Metro. The station opened on 25 May 2019.

== Station Layout ==
G	Entrances and Exits	Exits B-D, F, G
B1	Concourse	Faregates, Station Agent
B2	Northbound	← Line 9 towards Nujianggongyuan (Jilihujie)
B2	Island platform, doors open on the left
B2	Southbound	Line 9 towards Jianzhudaxue (Caozhong) →
B3	Westbound	← Line 3 towards Lida (Nanyanghujie)
B3	Island platform, doors open on the left
B3	Eastbound	Line 3 towards Fangjialan (Nanliguan) →
