= Tianchengjie station =

Shenyang Metro station

Tianchengjie 天成街 metro
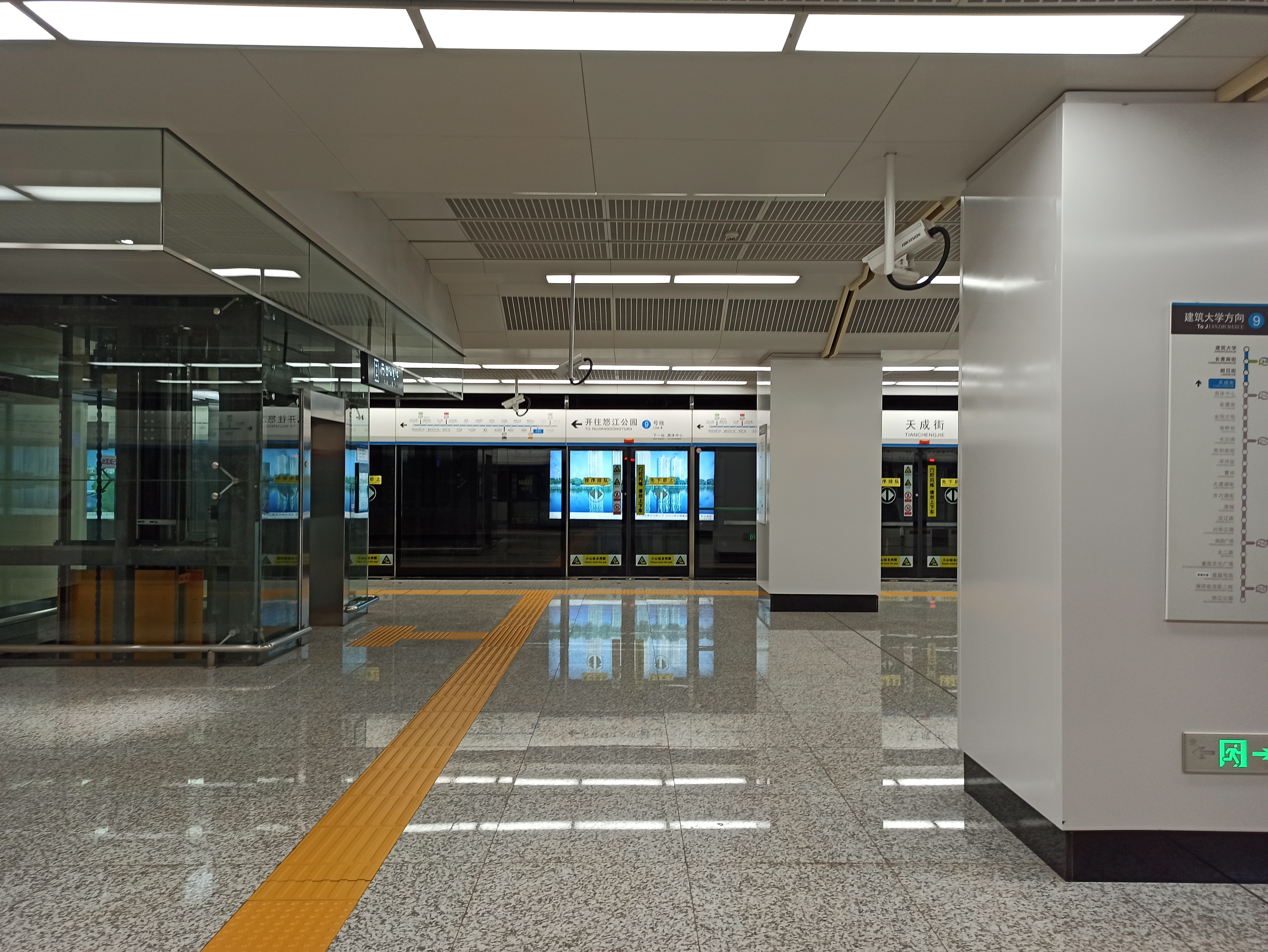

General information
- Location: Intersection of Hunnan 4th Rd. and Tiancheng St. Hunnan District, Shenyang, Liaoning; China
- Operator: Shenyang Metro
- Line: Line 9
- Platforms: 2

Construction
- Structure type: Underground
- Accessible: Yes

History
- Opened: 25 May 2019; 7 years ago

Services
Preceding station	Shenyang Metro	Following station
Aotizhongxin towards Nujianggongyuan	Line 9	Langrijie towards Jianzhudaxue
Location

Tianchengjie (Chinese: 天成街站; pinyin: Tiānchéngjiē Zhàn) is a station on Line 9 of the Shenyang Metro. The station opened on 25 May 2019.

== Station Layout ==
G	Entrances and Exits	Exits C-D
B1	Concourse	Faregates, Station Agent
B2	Northbound	← Line 9 towards Nujianggongyuan (Aotizhongxin)
B2	Island platform, doors open on the left
B2	Southbound	Line 9 towards Jianzhudaxue (Langrijie) →
