= Hunhezhan station =

Shenyang Metro station

Hunhezhan 浑河站 metro
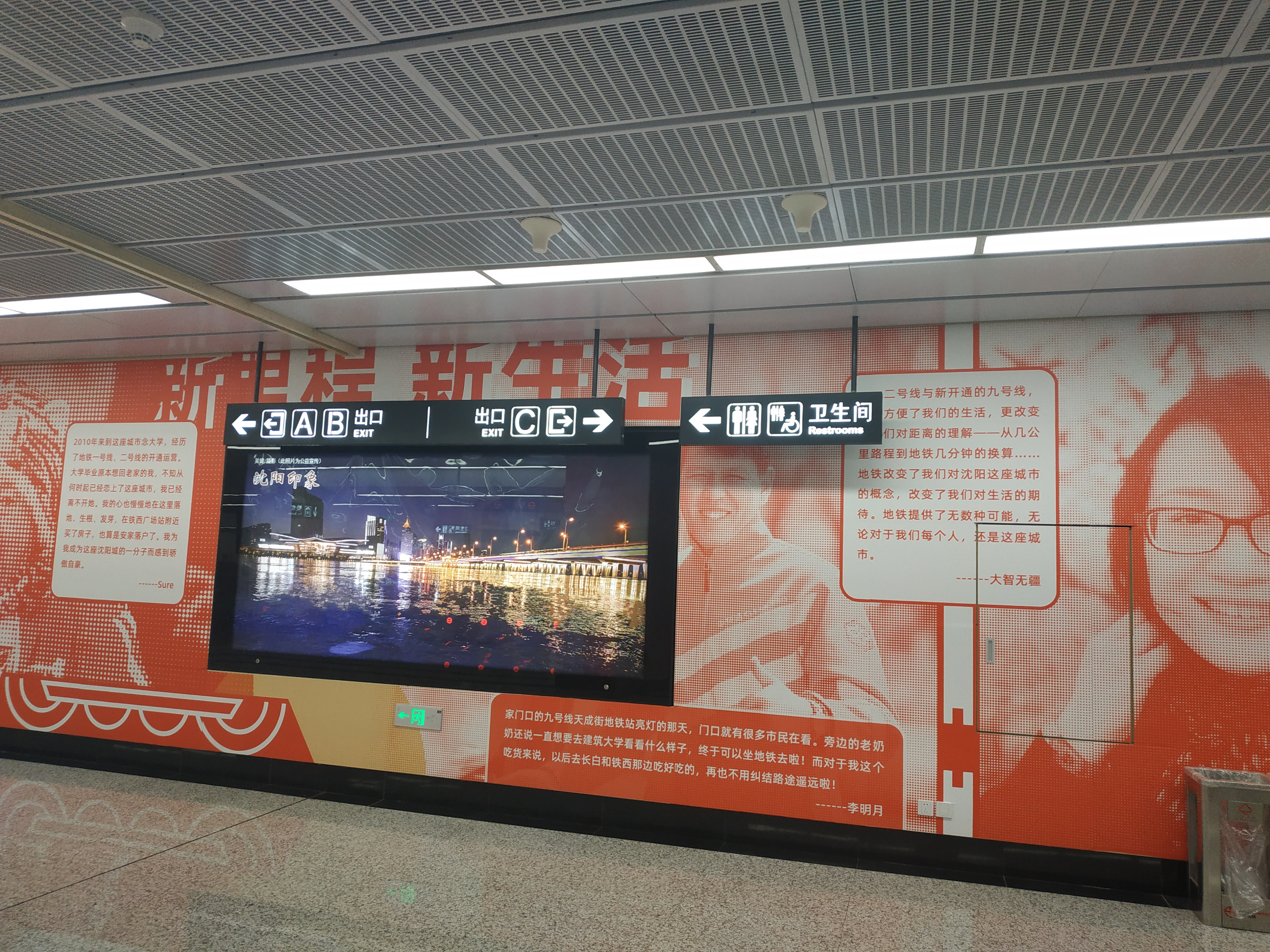

General information
- Location: Intersection of Hunnan West Rd. and Shensu West Rd. Heping District, Shenyang, Liaoning; China
- Operator: Shenyang Metro
- Line: Line 9
- Platforms: 2

Construction
- Structure type: Underground
- Accessible: Yes

History
- Opened: 25 May 2019; 7 years ago

Services
Preceding station	Shenyang Metro	Following station
Caozhong towards Nujianggongyuan	Line 9	Shenglinanjie towards Jianzhudaxue
Location

Hunhezhan (Chinese: 浑河站站; pinyin: Húnhézhàn Zhàn) is a station on Line 9 of the Shenyang Metro. It is close to Hunhe railway station. The station opened on 25 May 2019.

The under construction Line 6 will serve this station in the future.

== Station Layout ==
G	Entrances and Exits	Exits A-C
B1	Concourse	Faregates, Station Agent
B2	Northbound	← Line 9 towards Nujianggongyuan (Caozhong)
B2	Island platform, doors open on the left
B2	Southbound	Line 9 towards Jianzhudaxue (Shenglinanjie) →
