= Caozhong station =

Shenyang Metro station

Caozhong 曹仲 metro
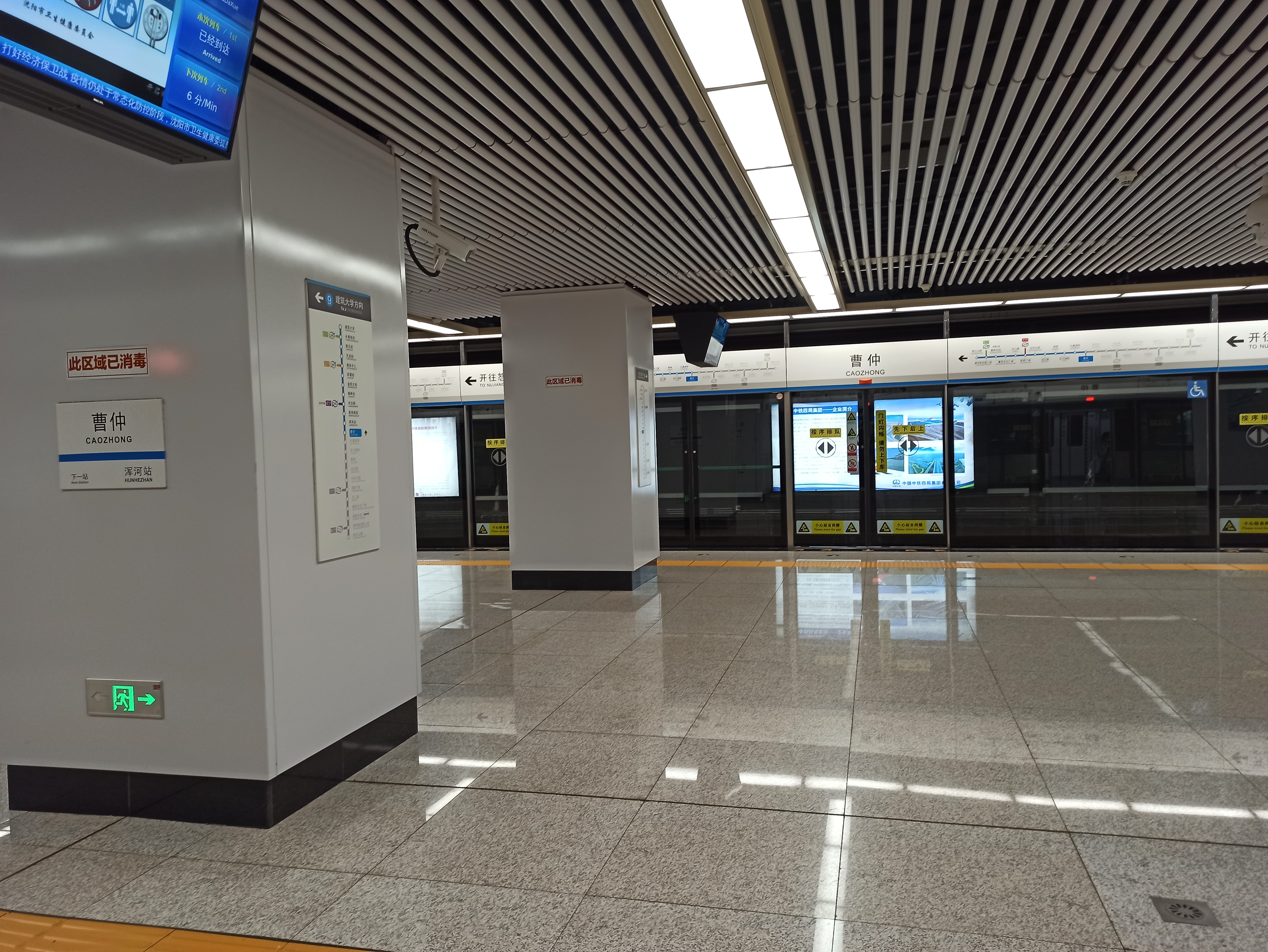

General information
- Location: Hunnan Rd. Heping District, Shenyang, Liaoning; China
- Coordinates: 41.73008°N 123.35478°E
- Operator: Shenyang Metro
- Line: Line 9
- Platforms: 2

Construction
- Structure type: Underground
- Accessible: Yes

History
- Opened: 25 May 2019; 7 years ago

Services
Preceding station	Shenyang Metro	Following station
Datonghujie towards Nujianggongyuan	Line 9	Hunhezhan towards Jianzhudaxue
Location

Caozhong (Chinese: 曹仲站; pinyin: Cáozhòng Zhàn) is a station on Line 9 of the Shenyang Metro. The station opened on 25 May 2019.

== Station Layout ==
G	Entrances and Exits	Exits B-D
B1	Concourse	Faregates, Station Agent
B2	Northbound	← Line 9 towards Nujianggongyuan (Datonghujie)
B2	Island platform, doors open on the left
B2	Southbound	Line 9 towards Jianzhudaxue (Hunhezhan) →
