= Jilihujie station =

Shenyang Metro station

Jilihujie 吉力湖街 metro
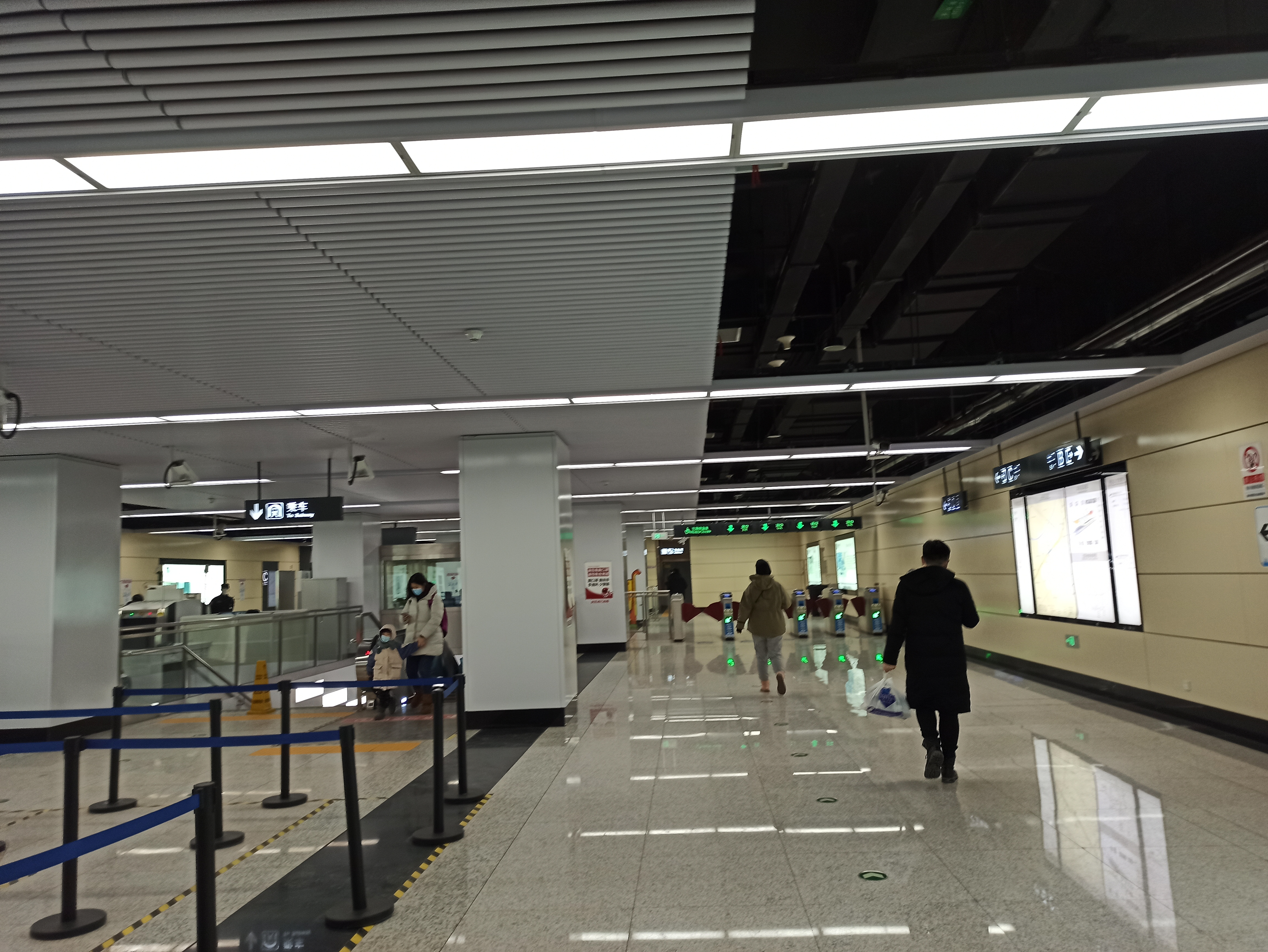

General information
- Location: Intersection of Xihe Rd. and Jilihu St. Yuhong District, Shenyang, Liaoning; China
- Coordinates: 41.7588°N 123.3398°E
- Operator: Shenyang Metro
- Line: Line 9
- Platforms: 2

Construction
- Structure type: Underground
- Accessible: Yes

History
- Opened: 25 May 2019; 7 years ago

Services
Preceding station	Shenyang Metro	Following station
Huaxiang towards Nujianggongyuan	Line 9	Datonghujie towards Jianzhudaxue
Location

Jilihujie (Chinese: 吉力湖街站; pinyin: Jílìhújiē Zhàn) is a station on Line 9 of the Shenyang Metro. The station opened on 25 May 2019.

== Station Layout ==
G	Entrances and Exits	Exits B-C
B1	Concourse	Faregates, Station Agent
B2	Northbound	← Line 9 towards Nujianggongyuan (Huaxiang)
B2	Island platform, doors open on the left
B2	Southbound	Line 9 towards Jianzhudaxue (Datonghujie) →
