= Shenglinanjie station =

Shenyang Metro station

Shenglinanjie 胜利南街 metro
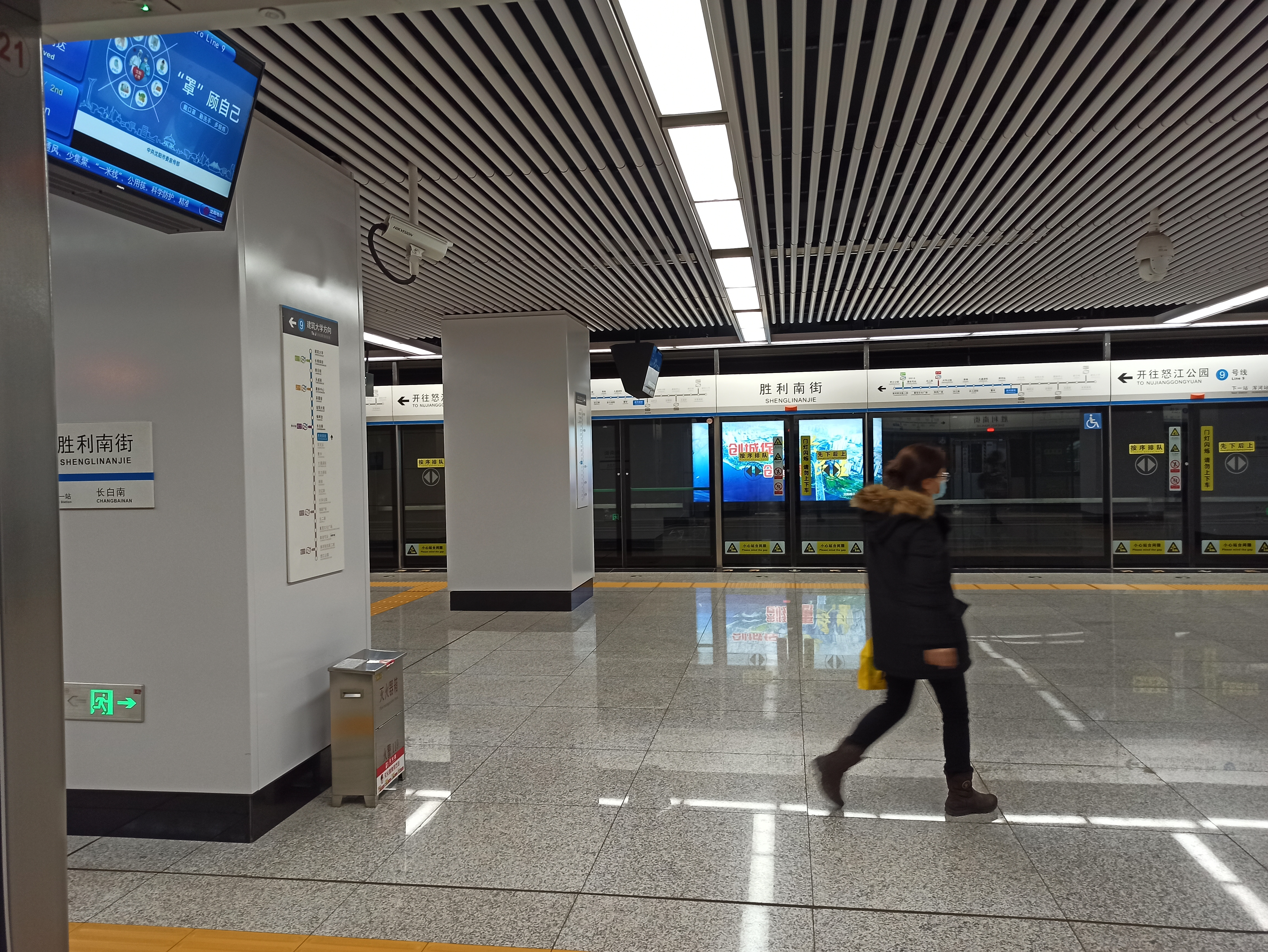

General information
- Location: Intersection of Hunnan West Rd. and Shengli South St. Heping District, Shenyang, Liaoning; China
- Coordinates: 41.7224°N 123.3925°E
- Operator: Shenyang Metro
- Line: Line 9
- Platforms: 2

Construction
- Structure type: Underground
- Accessible: Yes

History
- Opened: 25 May 2019; 7 years ago

Services
Preceding station	Shenyang Metro	Following station
Hunhezhan towards Nujianggongyuan	Line 9	Changbainan towards Jianzhudaxue
Location

Shenglinanjie (Chinese: 胜利南街站; pinyin: Shènglìnánjiē Zhàn) is a station on Line 9 of the Shenyang Metro. The station opened on 25 May 2019.

== Station Layout ==
G	Entrances and Exits	Exits A-D
B1	Concourse	Faregates, Station Agent
B2	Northbound	← Line 9 towards Nujianggongyuan (Hunhezhan)
B2	Island platform, doors open on the left
B2	Southbound	Line 9 towards Jianzhudaxue (Changbainan) →
