= Line 9 (Shenyang Metro) =

Metro line in Shenyang, China

- Line 9 train

Overview
- Status: Operational
- Owner: Shenyang
- Locale: Shenyang, Liaoning, China
- Termini: Nujianggongyuan; Jianzhudaxue
- Stations: 23

Service
- Type: Rapid transit
- System: Shenyang Metro
- Services: 1
- Operator(s): Shenyang Metro Corporation

History
- Opened: 25 May 2019; 6 years ago

Technical
- Line length: 28.996 km (18.017 mi)
- Number of tracks: 2
- Character: Underground
- Track gauge: 1,435 mm (4 ft 8 1/2 in)

Line 9 of the Shenyang Metro (Chinese: 沈阳地铁9号线; pinyin: Shěnyáng Dìtiě Jiǔ Hào Xiàn) is a rapid transit line running from northwest to southeast Shenyang in an "L" shape. Line 9, together with Line 10, forms a loop around Shenyang.

Phase 1 of Line 9 is 28.996 km (18.017 mi) long with 23 stations. The line opened on 25 May 2019.

== Opening timeline ==
Segment	Commencement	Length	Station(s)	Name
Nujianggongyuan — Jianzhudaxue	25 May 2019	28.996 km (18.02 mi)	22	Phase 1
Huanggutunzhan	30 March 2021	Infill station	1	

== Stations ==
Station name		Transfer	Distance km		Location
Pinyin	Chinese	Transfer	Distance km		Location
Nujianggongyuan	怒江公园		0	0	Huanggu/Yuhong
Huaihejieshenyieryuan	淮河街沈医二院	10			Huanggu
Huanggutunzhan	皇姑屯站				Huanggu
Zhongxingwenhuaguangchang	重型文化广场				Tiexi
Beierlu	北二路				Tiexi
Tiexiguangchang	铁西广场	1			Tiexi
Xinghuagongyuan	兴华公园				Tiexi
Shenliaolu	沈辽路				Tiexi
Huaxiang	滑翔				Tiexi
Jilihujie	吉力湖街				Yuhong
Datonghujie	大通湖街	3			Yuhong
Caozhong	曹仲				Heping
Hunhezhan	浑河站				Heping
Shenglinanjie	胜利南街				Heping/Hunnan
Changbainan	长白南	4			Heping
Yushutai	榆树台				Hunnan
Jinyangdajie	金阳大街				Hunnan
Caixiajie	彩霞街				Hunnan
Aotizhongxin	奥体中心	2 Tram Line 1/5			Hunnan
Tianchengjie	天成街	Tram Line 5			Hunnan
Langrijie	朗日街	Tram Line 5			Hunnan
Changqingnanjie	长青南街	10; Tram Line 5			Hunnan
Jianzhudaxue	建筑大学	Tram Line 5		28.996	Hunnan
