= Line 6 (Shenyang Metro) =

Metro line in Shenyang, China

- 6

Overview
- Status: Under construction
- Owner: Shenyang
- Locale: Shenyang, Liaoning, China
- Stations: 30

Service
- Type: Rapid transit
- System: Shenyang Metro
- Services: 1
- Operator: Shenyang Metro Corporation

Technical
- Line length: 35.25 km (21.90 mi)
- Number of tracks: 2
- Character: Underground and elevated
- Track gauge: 1,435 mm (4 ft 8 1/2 in)

Line 6 of the Shenyang Metro (Chinese: 沈阳地铁六号线) is a rapid transit line running from north to south Shenyang. It is the seventh line of the Shenyang Metro to start construction and expected to open in 2026.

== History ==
Construction started on 26 December 2020.

== Stations (north to south) ==
station name		Transfer	Distance km	
Pinyin	Chinese	Transfer	Distance km	
Yalujiangbeijie	鸭绿江北街		0.00	0.00
Wenchulu	文储路			
Guanyinlu	观音路			
Xiyao	西窑			
Jinshanbeilu	金山北路			
Yingxionggongyuan	英雄公园			
Tieshanlu	铁山路			
Beita	北塔	10		
Shenyangdaxue	沈阳大学	4		
Zhongjie	中街	1		
Dananmen	大南门			
Shifuyingyiyuan	市妇婴医院			
Dananbianmen	大南边门			
Nanta	南塔	3		
Wencuilu	文萃路			
Shitushuguan	市图书馆	2		
Sanhaoqiao	三好桥			
Nandixilu	南堤西路			
Changbaidao	长白岛	4		
Mazong	马总			
Jingsai	竞赛			
Hunhezhan	浑河站	9		
Zuxinglu	族兴路			
Xiahewan	下河湾			
Manrong	满融			
Gaolouzi	高楼子			
Kuisonglu	葵松路			
Xuesonglu	雪松路			
Shaliulu	沙柳路			
