= Line 3 (Shenyang Metro) =

Metro line in Shenyang, China

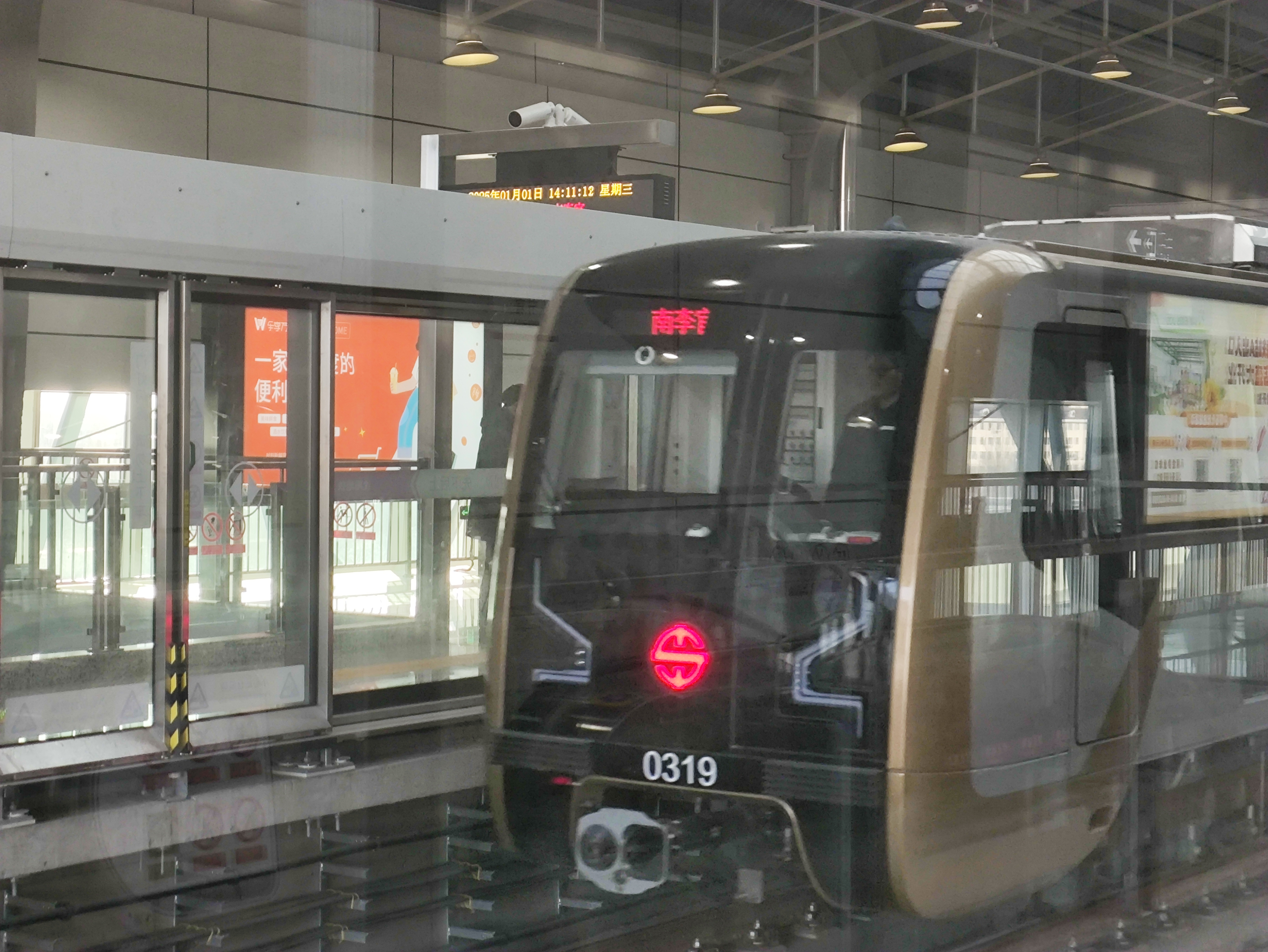
- Line 3 train at Ningguan station

Overview
- Status: Operational
- Owner: Shenyang
- Locale: Shenyang, Liaoning, China
- Termini: Lida; Fangjialan
- Stations: 27

Service
- Type: Rapid transit
- System: Shenyang Metro
- Operator: Shenyang Metro Corporation

History
- Opened: 30 December 2024; 18 months ago

Technical
- Line length: 37 km (23 mi)
- Number of tracks: 2
- Track gauge: 1,435 mm (4 ft 8 1/2 in)

Line 3 of the Shenyang Metro (Chinese: 沈阳地铁3号线) is a rapid transit line in Shenyang, China.

The east section from Lingkong to Fangjialan was opened at 9:20 am on 30 June 2026.

== Opening timeline ==
Segment	Commencement	Length	Station(s)	Name
Lida — Nanliguan	30 December 2024	23 km (14 mi)	14	West section of Phase 1
Lingkong — Fangjialan	30 June 2026	14 km (8.7 mi)	13	East section of Phase 1

== Stations ==
Station name		Transfer	Distance km	Location
Pinyin	Chinese	Transfer	Distance km	Location
Lida	李达			Tiexi
Tiexiqichegongchang	铁西汽车工厂			Tiexi
Mabei	马贝			Tiexi
Zhongdedajie	中德大街			Tiexi
Xiheyougu	细河悠谷			Tiexi
Zhaijia	翟家			Tiexi
Gongyedaxue	工业大学			Tiexi
Ningguan	宁官			Tiexi
Yuliang	余良			Tiexi
Ganguan	甘官			Yuhong
Qiandaohujie	千岛湖街			Yuhong
Nanyanghujie	南阳湖街			Yuhong
Datonghujie	大通湖街	9		Yuhong
Nanliguan	南李官			Yuhong
Lingkong	凌空			Tiexi
Shayang	砂阳	4		Heping
Nanbamalu	南八马路			Heping
Jiaxingjie	嘉兴街			Heping
Fangxingguangchang	方型广场			Heping
Sanhaojie	三好街			Heping
Gongyezhanlanguan	工业展览馆	2		Shenhe
Zhongkeyuanjinshusuo	中科院金属所			Shenhe
Nanta	南塔	6		Shenhe
Wenfulu	文富路			Shenhe
Fuminjie	富民街			Shenhe
Jiangdongjie	江东街	10		Shenhe
Fangjialan	方家栏			Shenhe
