= Line 4 (Shenyang Metro) =

Metro line in Shenyang, China

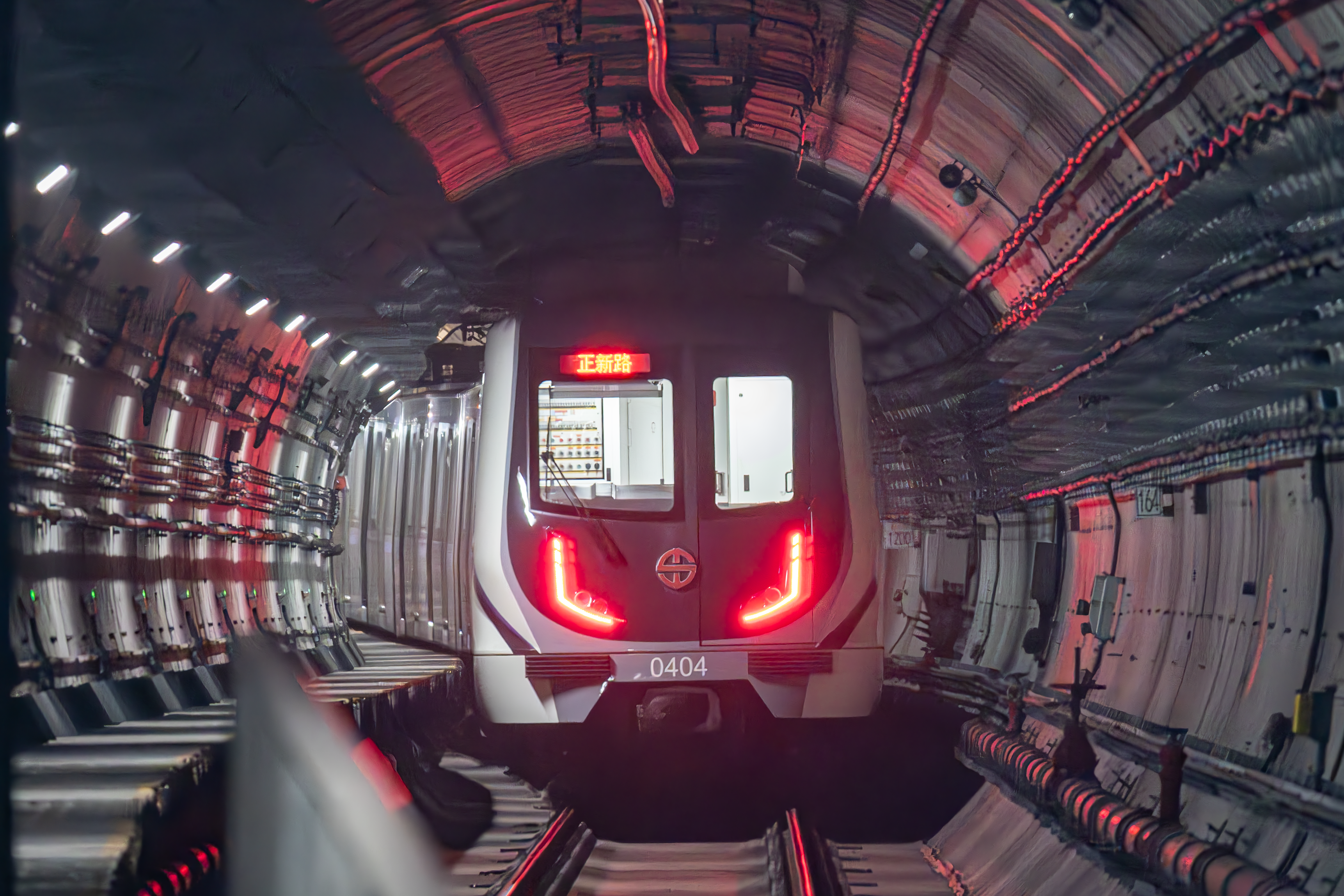
- Line 4 Train

Overview
- Status: Operational
- Owner: Shenyang
- Locale: Shenyang, Liaoning, China
- Termini: Zhengxinlu; Chuangxinlu
- Stations: 23

Service
- Type: Rapid transit
- System: Shenyang Metro
- Operator: Shenyang Metro Corporation

History
- Opened: 29 September 2023; 2 years ago

Technical
- Line length: 34.11 km (21.19 mi)
- Number of tracks: 2
- Character: Underground
- Track gauge: 1,435 mm (4 ft 8 1/2 in)

Line 4 of the Shenyang Metro (Chinese: 沈阳地铁4号线) is a rapid transit line in Shenyang, China. The line is 34.11 km long with 23 stations and was opened on 29 September 2023.

== Opening timeline ==
Segment	Commencement	Length	Station(s)	Name
Zhengxinlu — Chuangxinlu	29 September 2023	34.11 km (21.19 mi)	23	Phase 1

== Stations ==
Station name		Transfer	Distance km	Location
Pinyin	Chinese	Transfer	Distance km	Location
Zhengxinlu	正新路			Dadong
Wenguanjie	文官街			Dadong
Wanghua	望花			Dadong
Guanquanlu	观泉路			Dadong
Beidaying	北大营			Dadong
Hezuojie	合作街	10		Dadong
Taochangjie	洮昌街			Dadong
Shenyangdaxue	沈阳大学			Dadong
Shenyangbeizhan	沈阳北站	2 SBT		Shenhe
Huangsilu	皇寺路			Heping
Shifudalu	市府大路			Heping
Taiyuanjie	太原街	1		Heping
Nanwumalu	南五马路			Heping
Shayang	砂阳	3		Heping
Nanjingqiao	南京桥			Heping
Changbaidao	长白岛			Heping
Changbainan	长白南	9		Hunnan
Jincanglu	金仓路			Sujiatun
Yunshanlu	云杉路			Hunnan
Hongchunlu	红椿路			Hunnan
Chengjianxueyuan	城建学院	Tram Line 1		Hunnan
Shenyangnanzhan	沈阳南站	SOT		Hunnan
Chuangxinlu	创新路	Tram Line 1/3		Hunnan
