= Xinghua Subdistrict, Shenyang =

Xinghua Subdistrict 兴华街道
- Subdistrict
- Location in Liaoning
- Coordinates: 41°47′00″N 123°21′32″E
- Country: People's Republic of China
- Province: Liaoning
- Sub-provincial city: Shenyang
- District: Tiexi
- Village-level divisions: 6 residential communities
- Elevation: 45 m (148 ft)
- Time zone: UTC+8 (China Standard)
- Area code: 0024

Xinghua Subdistrict (simplified Chinese: 兴华街道; traditional Chinese: 興華街道; pinyin: Xīnghuá Jiēdào) is a subdistrict of Tiexi District, Shenyang, People's Republic of China. As of 2011, it has six residential communities (社区) under its administration.

== See also ==
- List of township-level divisions of Liaoning
