= Shenyang Modern Tram =

Tram network in Shenyang, China

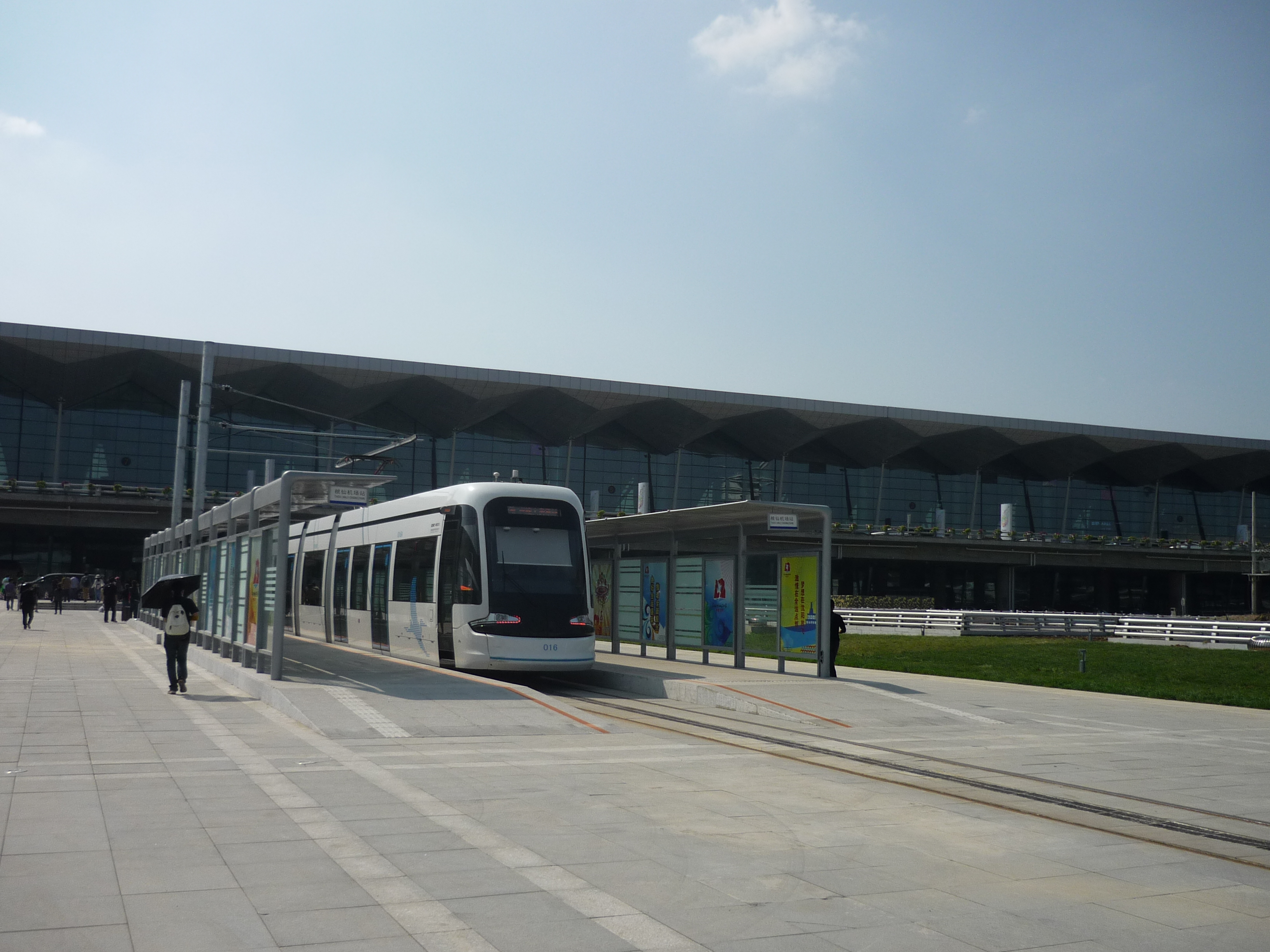
- Shenyang New Tram in front of airport

Operation
- Locale: Shenyang, People's Republic of China
- Open: 15 August 2013; 12 years ago
- Lines: 3

Infrastructure
- Track gauge: 1,435 mm (4 ft 8 1/2 in) standard gauge
- Depot: 2

Statistics
- Route length: 62 km (39 mi)
Horse Tram era
- Track gauge: 1,435 mm (4 ft 8 1/2 in) standard gauge
Japanese-Owned era: 1925–1973
- Track gauge: 1,435 mm (4 ft 8 1/2 in) standard gauge
Current era: 2013
- Track gauge: 1,435 mm (4 ft 8 1/2 in) standard gauge
- Track length (double): 97.45 km (60.55 mi)
- Stops: 65
- Website: www.syygdc.com

Shenyang Modern Tram is a tram network operating in Hunnan New District in southern Shenyang, Liaoning province, People's Republic of China. The tram system mostly uses a traditional overhead line system, but some sections are wireless with the tram running partly on super-capacitor batteries charging at every stop, the first such system in Asia. It is the longest tram system in China.

Shenyang once had the largest tramway network (c. 1925) in China with service completely stopping in 1974. Trams returned in Shenyang with the opening of the Shenyang Modern Tram in 2013. The whole plan of Shenyang Modern Tram is running from Olympic Centre, near Aotizhongxin station of Shenyang Metro Line 2 to Shenfu Xincheng, Expo Centre and Taoxian Airport. The Shenyang tram system is funded by a BT model investment of CNY 4.82 billion by the construction and RATP Dev Transdev Asia, which is a joint venture between Transdev (formerly Veolia Transport) and RATP Dev. The line is operated by the city-owned "Shenyang Hunnan Modern Transport Co., Ltd" (51%) and RATP Dev Transdev Asia (49%).

== Operations ==
=== Tickets ===
From 1 March 2019, the base fare is 2 Yuan for journeys under 8 km (5.0 mi), 3 yuan for journeys between 8 and 16 km (4.97 and 9.94 mi), and 4 yuan for journeys longer than 16 km (9.94 mi).

Before 1 March 2019, the implementation of a single one-way fare as 2 Yuan.

Tram payment is possible via both cash and IC card.

=== Tram routes ===
- 1 – Olympic Centre to Expo Centre
- 3 – Century Tower to Expo Centre
- 5 – Olympic Centre to Shenfu Xincheng

==== Former routes ====
- 6 – Shenyang South to Taoxian Airport (cancelled in 2020 due to COVID-19 pandemic)
- 2 – Olympic Centre to Taoxian Airport (cancelled on 28 October 2024)
- 4 – Shenyang South to Century Tower (cancelled on 28 October 2024)

Description

Line 3 runs from Century Building (where it interchanges with the Subway Line 2 station Shijidasha) to Expo Centre via University Science City. At North-Eastern University it interchanges with Line 1.

=== Network info ===
- Total length – 97.45 kilometres (60.55 mi)
- Opened – September 15, 2013
- Number of stops – 71
- Number of routes – 6
- Gauge – Standard gauge
- Number of tramcars – 35

=== Depots & termini ===
The two tram depots are in Hunnan and Dadianzicun. Terminuses are Olympic Centre, Shenfu Xincheng, Expo Centre and Taoxian Airport.

=== Alignment and interchanges ===
The modern tram routes partly run on unreserved track in middle of the road, partly on grass-bed, and partly on raised rail track.

There are interchanges with Shenyang Metro Line 2 – one at Aoti Zhongxin, the other at Baitahelu.

=== Rolling stock ===
The fleet consists of two types of trains: a 70% low-floor 3 segment trams and 100% low-floor 5 segment trams. The 70% low-floor 3 segment trams can has a capacity of 301 passengers and is 28.8m long, 2.650m wide with a floor height of 380mm. The first batch consists of 20 70% low-floor trams. Another batch of 5 trams for the Shenfu interurban line were ordered from CRRC Zhuhai. The 10 sets of 100% low floor trams are designed by IFS Design and manufactured by Voith together with CRRC Changchun Railway Vehicles. The 100% low floor trams are 38.4m long.

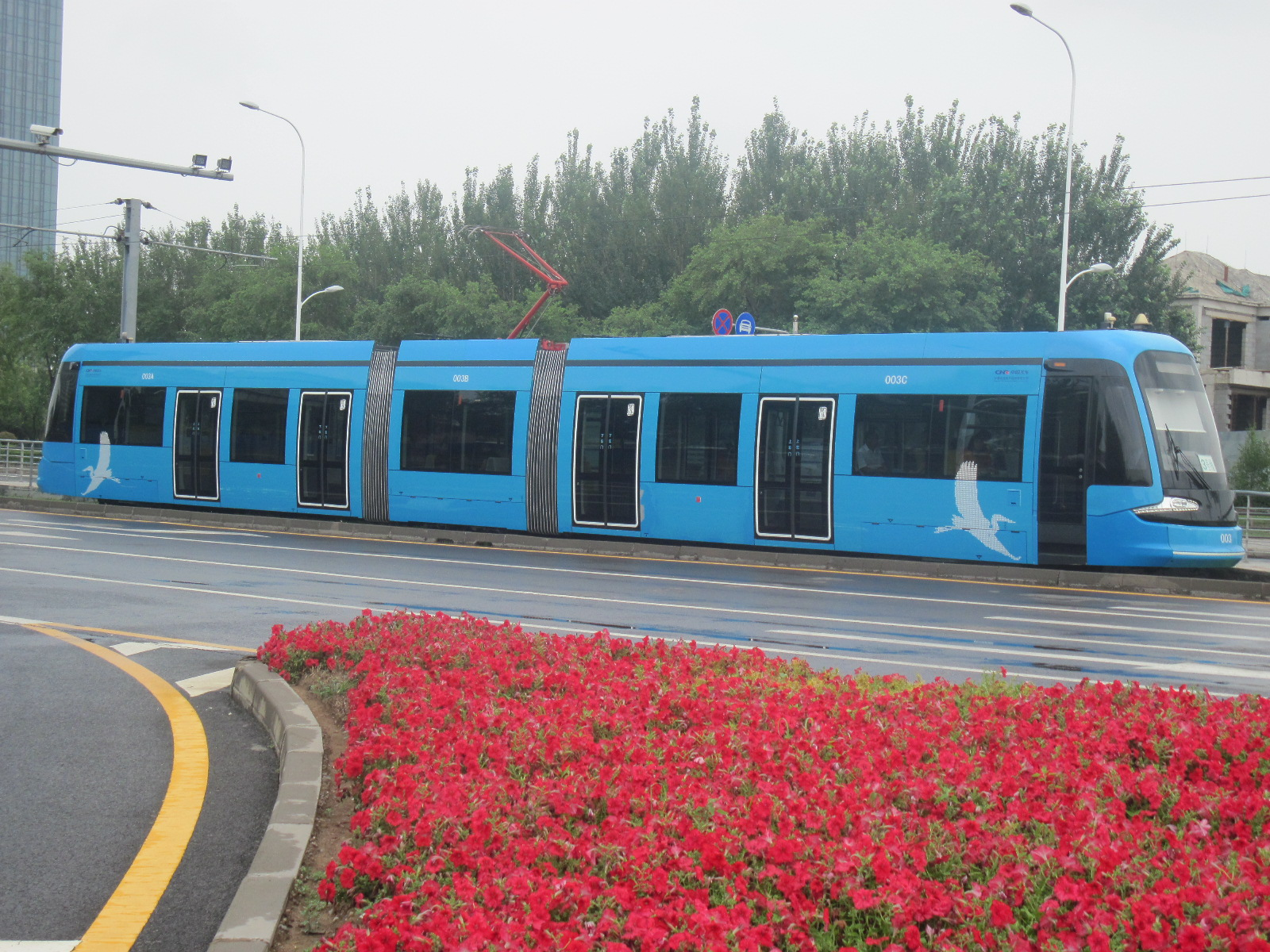
Phase 1 70% low floor tram

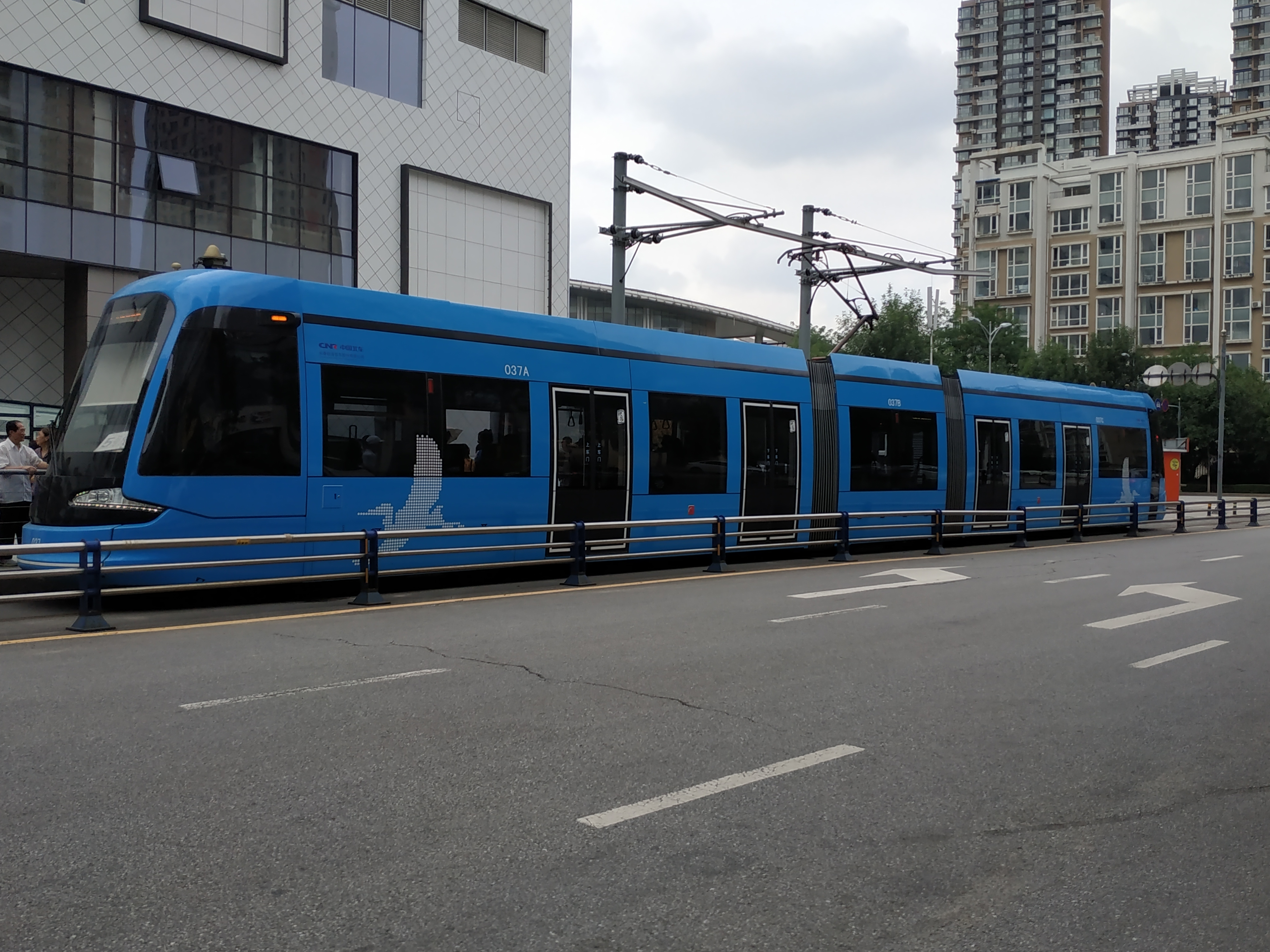
Phase 1 additional order 70% low floor tram

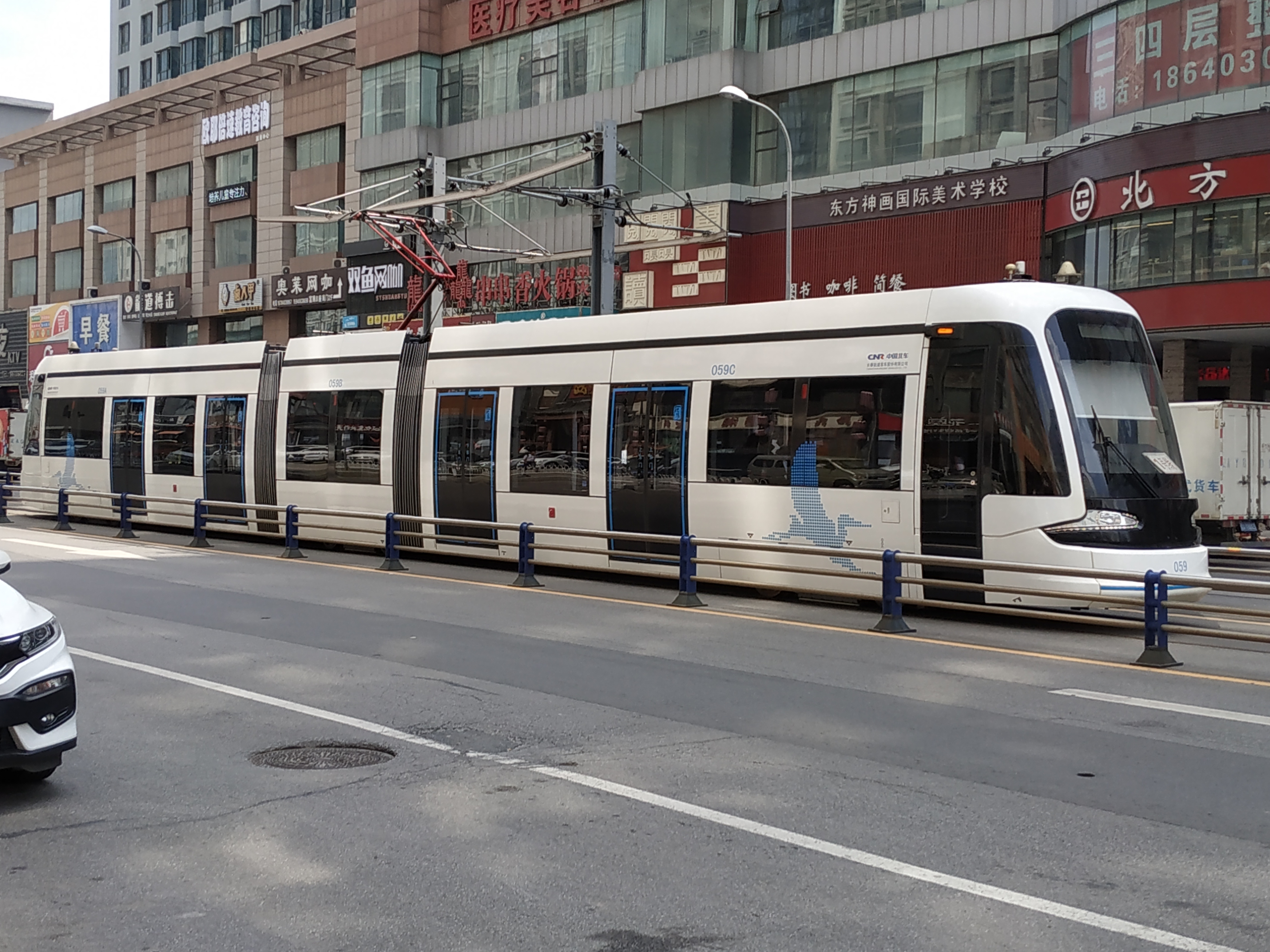
Phase 2 70% low floor tram

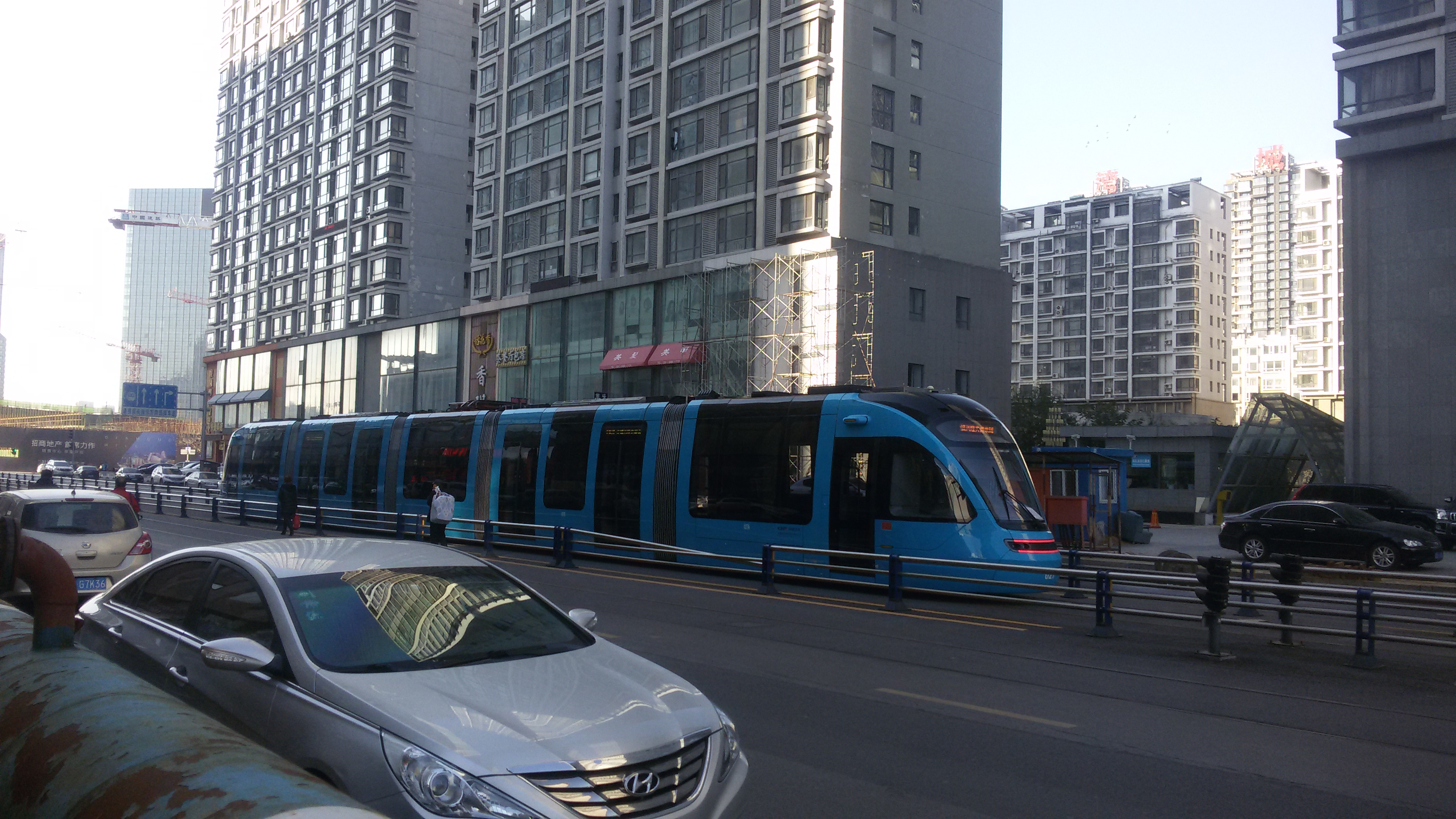
100% low-floor tram

== See also ==
- Trams in Shenyang – the first generation tramway network
- Shenyang Metro
