= Shenyang Transformation International School =

Private school in Shenyang, Liaoning, China

- 沈阳远见国际学校

Location
- 160 Quan Yun San Rd; Shenyang, Liaoning, 110167; China

Information
- Type: Private
- Established: 1998; 28 years ago
- Principal: James Linder
- Grades: K-12
- Enrollment: 125
- Average class size: K-5th: 12; 6th-12th: 6
- Language: English
- Mascot: Phoenix
- Accreditation: WASC
- Affiliations: ACSI, ACAMIS
- Website: www.stisedu.org

Shenyang Transformation International School
- Simplified Chinese: 沈阳远见国际学校
- Traditional Chinese: 瀋陽遠見國際學校
Transcriptions
Standard Mandarin
- Hanyu Pinyin: Shěnyáng Yuǎnjiàn Guójì Xuéxiào

Shenyang International School
- Simplified Chinese: 沈阳国际学校
- Traditional Chinese: 瀋陽國際學校
Transcriptions
Standard Mandarin
- Hanyu Pinyin: Shěnyáng Guójì Xuéxiào

Shenyang Transformation International School (Chinese: 沈阳远见国际学校; formerly Shenyang International School) is an international school in Dongling District, Shenyang, China. The school was established in 1998 to provide a North American, college-preparatory education from a Judeo-Christian worldview to expatriate elementary, middle, and high school students in the Shenyang, Liaoning area of Northeastern China. Originally a member of the International Schools Consortium (ISC).

In 2017, the SYIS collaboration with ISC was dissolved, and SYIS partnered with Transformation Academy (TA), which operates schools in Shenyang and Shanghai, to form Shenyang Transformation International School (STIS).

The majority of the teaching staff are from the United States, but there are also instructors from New Zealand, South Africa, the Philippines, and China.

== History ==
SYIS Shenyang International School was founded in 1998 by the International School of China (ISC) with the main purpose of supporting foreign families in China who wanted to give their children an international education in a multi-cultural environment. The school began with only eighteen students and three foreign teachers.

After being established in Shenyang, the school moved a few times. The school is currently situated in the New Hunnan District.
