= Tiexi, Shenyang =

Tiexi 铁西区
- District
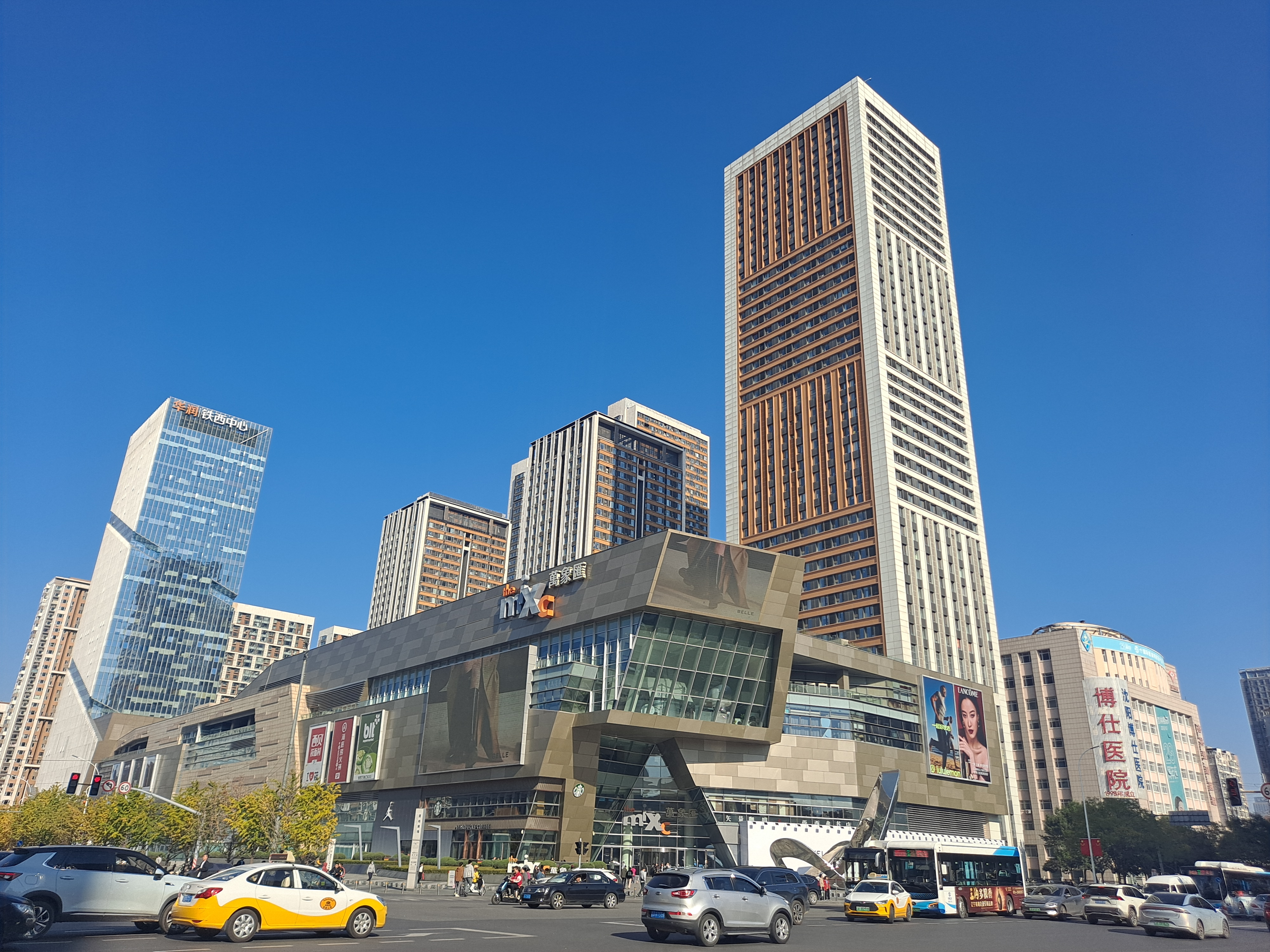

- Location in Liaoning
- Coordinates: 41°43′11″N 123°12′43″E
- Country: People's Republic of China
- Province: Liaoning
- Sub-provincial city: Shenyang

Area
  - Total: 286 km^{2} (110 sq mi)

Population (2020)
  - Total: 1,335,935
  - Density: 4,670/km^{2} (12,100/sq mi)
- Time zone: UTC+8 (China Standard)
- Postal code: 110021~110027

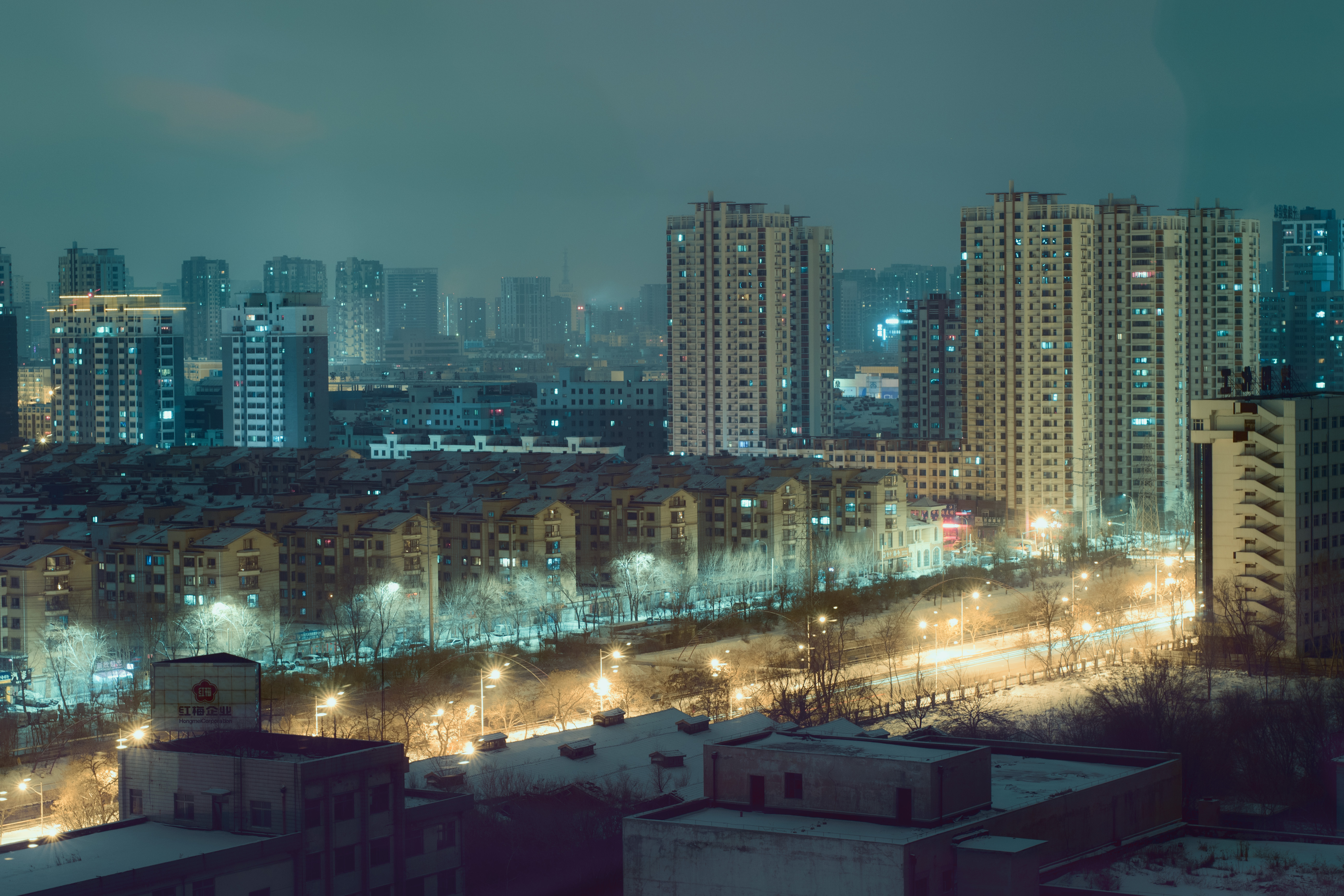

Tiexi District (simplified Chinese: 铁西区; traditional Chinese: 鐵西區; pinyin: Tiěxī Qū) is one of ten districts of the prefecture-level city of Shenyang, the capital of Liaoning Province, Northeast China, and forms part of the urban core. It borders Yuhong District to the north, Huanggu District to the northeast, Heping District to the east, Sujiatun District to the southeast, Liaozhong County to the southwest, and Xinmin City to the northwest; it also borders the prefecture-level city of Liaoyang to the south.

== Administrative divisions ==
There are 20 subdistricts within the district.

Subdistricts:

- Lingkong Subdistrict (凌空街道), Qinggong Subdistrict (轻工街道), Weigong Subdistrict (卫工街道), Qi Lu Subdistrict (七路街道), Shi'er Road Subdistrict (十二路街道), Luguan Subdistrict (路官街道), Qixian Subdistrict (齐贤街道), Xinggong Subdistrict (兴工街道), Qigong Subdistrict (启工街道), Jihong Subdistrict (霁虹街道), Chonggong Subdistrict (重工街道), Xinghua Subdistrict (兴华街道), Gongrencun Subdistrict (工人村街道), Guihe Subdistrict (贵和街道), Xingshun Subdistrict (兴顺街道), Yanfen Subdistrict (艳粉街道), Dugong Subdistrict (笃工街道), Xingqi Subdistrict (兴齐街道), Baogong Subdistrict (保工街道), Yunfeng Subdistrict (云峰街道)
