= Hunnan, Shenyang =

Hunnan 浑南区
- District
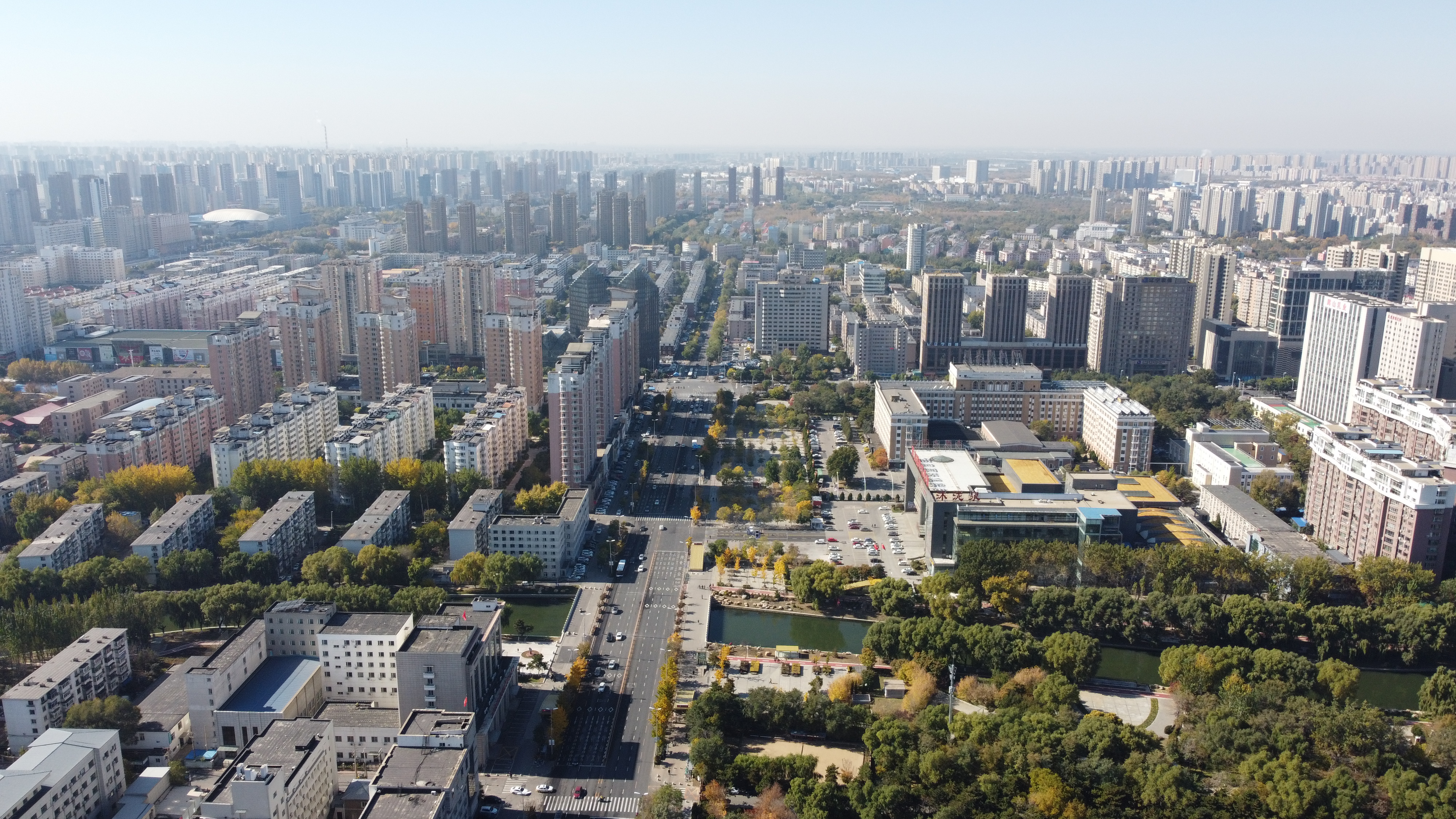

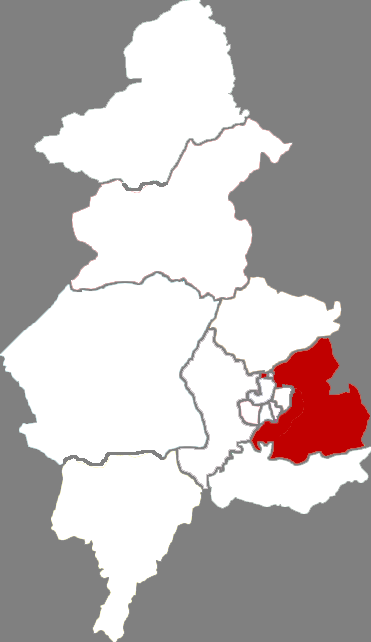
- Location in Shenyang

- Location in Liaoning
- Coordinates (Hunnan government): 41°42′54″N 123°26′59″E
- Country: People's Republic of China
- Province: Liaoning
- Sub-provincial city: Shenyang

Area
  - Total: 742 km^{2} (286 sq mi)

Population (2020)
  - Total: 798,765
  - Density: 1,080/km^{2} (2,790/sq mi)
- Time zone: UTC+8 (China Standard)

Hunnan District (simplified Chinese: 浑南区; traditional Chinese: 渾南區; pinyin: Húnnán Qū), formerly Dongling District (东陵区; 東陵區; Dōnglíng Qū) one of ten districts of the prefecture-level city of Shenyang, the capital of Liaoning Province, Northeast China, and forms part of the eastern and southeastern suburbs. The district contains 12 subdistricts of Shenyang proper, six towns, one rural township, and one ethnic rural township. It borders Shenbei New Area to the north, Sujiatun to the south, Heping to the west, and Shenhe and Dadong to the northwest; it also borders the prefecture-level city of Fushun to the east.

The former name Dongling refers to the Eastern Tomb, or Fuling Tomb, a UNESCO World Heritage Site, which is in fact two Qing dynasty tombs: of Nurhachi, the first emperor of Qing.

The district is rapidly becoming a developed, high-end residential area. There are two corridors along two major highways, one leading to the Eastern Tomb and Fushun, the other leading to the Shenyang Taoxian International Airport, along which one can see luxury apartments and sleek commercial development.

== Administrative divisions ==
The district contains 12 subdistricts, six towns, one township, and one ethnic township.

Subdistricts:

- Nanta Subdistrict (南塔街道), Quanyuan Subdistrict (泉园街道), Maguanqiao Subdistrict (马关桥街道), Fengle Subdistrict (丰乐街道), Huishan Subdistrict (辉山街道), Dongling Subdistrict (东陵街道), Yingda Subdistrict (英达街道), Qianjin Subdistrict (前进街道), Donghu Subdistrict (东湖街道), Wusan Subdistrict (五三街道), East Hunhe Station Subdistrict (浑河站东街道), West Hunhe Station Subdistrict (浑河站西街道)

Towns:

- Taoxian (桃仙镇), Gaokan (高坎镇), Zhujiatun (祝家屯镇), Shenjingzi (深井子镇), Lixiang (李相镇), Baita (白塔镇)

Townships:

- Wangbingou Township (王滨沟乡), Mantang Manchu Ethnic Township (满堂满族乡)

== Hunnan New Area ==
Hunnan New Area was envisaged in 1988 as one of the National High And New Technology Industry Development Zones in the first batch by the State Council in 1991. Construction began in 1991 and finished in October 2001.

The park also includes the following development areas:

- Shenyang High-tech Industrial Development Zone
- Shenyang Export Processing Zone
- Shenyang Singapore Industrial Park

Since 2010, Hunnan New Area has been under the same administration as Dongling District, which was renamed Hunnan District in July 2014.

== Education ==
Shenyang Transformation International School has its campus in the district.
