= Jianzhudaxue station =

Shenyang Metro station

Jianzhudaxue 建筑大学 metro

General information
- Location: Intersection of Hunnan Rd. and Wenhua St. Hunnan District, Shenyang, Liaoning; China
- Operator: Shenyang Metro
- Line: Line 9
- Platforms: 2

Construction
- Structure type: Underground
- Accessible: Yes

History
- Opened: 25 May 2019; 7 years ago

Services
Preceding station	Shenyang Metro	Following station
Changqingnanjie towards Nujianggongyuan	Line 9	Terminus
Location

Jianzhudaxue (Chinese: 建筑大学站; pinyin: Jiànzhúdàxué Zhàn) is a station and the southern terminus on Line 9 of the Shenyang Metro. The station opened on 25 May 2019.

== Station Layout ==
G	Entrances and Exits	Exits B-D
B1	Concourse	Faregates, Station Agent
B2	Northbound	← Line 9 towards Nujianggongyuan (Changqingnanjie)
B2	Island platform, doors open on the left
B2	Southbound	Line 9 termination track →
