= Shenyang Metro =

Public transport system in Shenyang, China

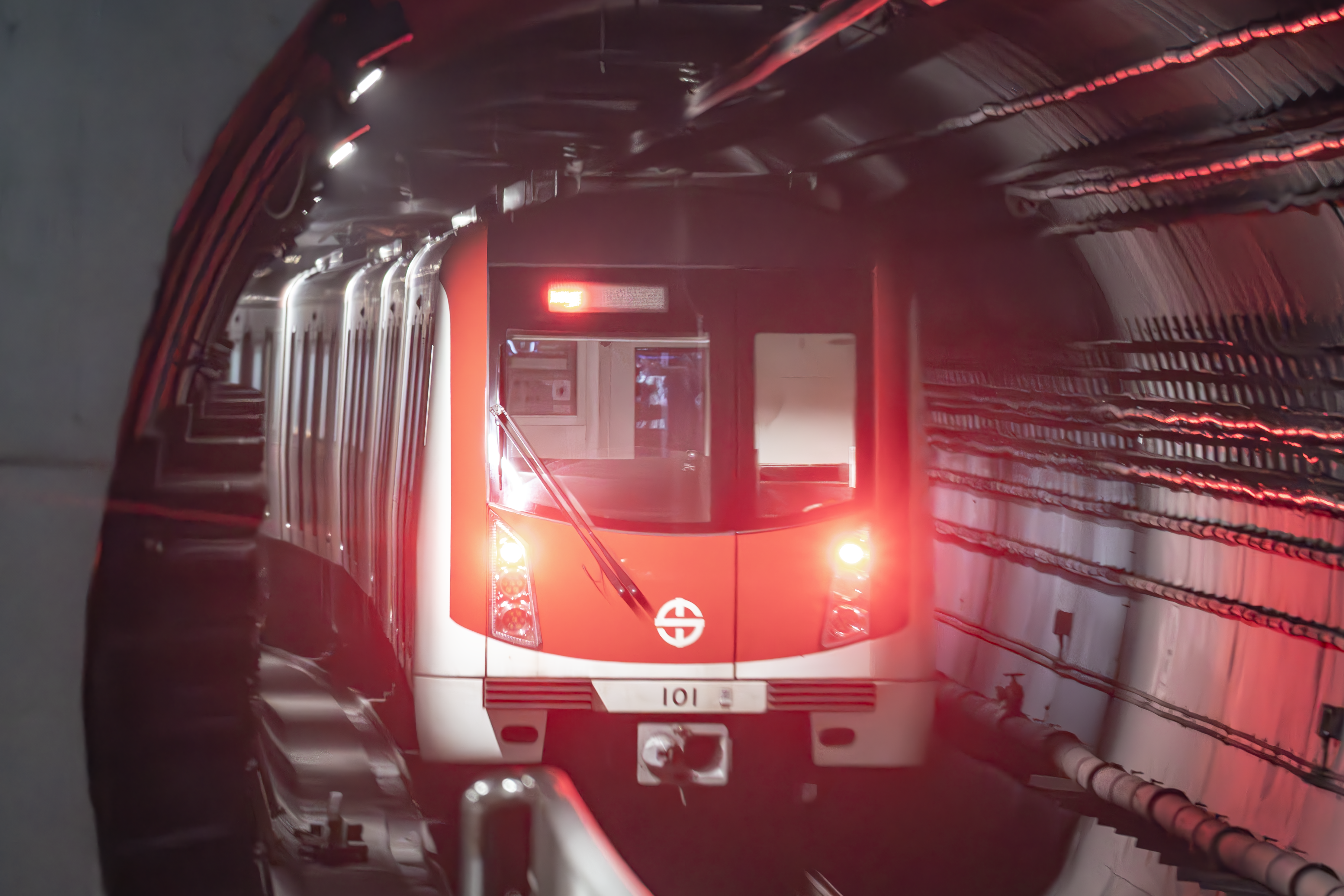
- A Line 1 train

Overview
- Native name: 沈阳地铁
- Locale: Shenyang, China
- Transit type: Rapid transit
- Number of lines: 6
- Number of stations: 144
- Daily ridership: 1.072 million (2021 daily); 391 million (2021 annual)
- Website: http://www.symtc.com/

Operation
- Began operation: 27 September 2010; 16 years ago

Technical
- System length: 218 km (135 mi)
System map

The Shenyang Metro is a rapid transit system part of the urban rail transit system of Shenyang, Liaoning, China. It currently covers 9 of the 10 municipal districts in Shenyang City (except Liaozhong District). Shenyang is the seventh city in Mainland China with an underground subway. Shenyang's earliest written subway planning can be traced back to 1940 during the Manchurian period. After the founding of the People's Republic of China, due to some reasons, Shenyang Metro has been set up many times, and the construction has been suspended several times. The construction of the Shenyang Metro, which is currently in operation, began in 2005 and has been in operation since September 27, 2010. As of January 2025, Shenyang Metro has a total of 6 operating lines with a total length of 186.7 kilometers and 136 operating stations. In 2020, the annual passenger traffic was 310 million, with an average daily passenger flow of 849,000. Shenyang Metro is operated and built by Shenyang Metro Group Co., Ltd.

Shenyang Metro
- Simplified Chinese: 沈阳地铁
- Traditional Chinese: 瀋陽地鐵
Transcriptions
Standard Mandarin
- Hanyu Pinyin: Shěnyáng Dìtiě

== Overview ==
The Shenyang Metro consists of Line 1 (east-west), opened on September 27, 2010, with 27.8 km (17.3 mi) of track and 22 stations, and Line 2 (north-south), opened on January 9, 2012, with 27.16 km (16.88 mi) of track and 22 stations. Line 9 opened on May 25, 2019. The line is 28.996 km (18.017 mi) in length. Line 10 opened on April 29, 2020.

The construction of Line 1 started on November 18, 2005. Trial service not open to the public started in September 2009, with the line fully operational in September 2010. The total cost of Line 1 was 8.88 billion yuan (USD 1.1 billion).

The construction on Line 2 started on November 18, 2006, with 19 stations and 19.3 km (12.0 mi). It became operational on January 9, 2012.

A Line 2 extension to Hangkonghangtiandaxue station opened on December 30, 2013. Another extension to Putianlu station opened on April 8, 2018.

The original loop line is broken into two L-shaped lines, Line 9 and Line 10, that intersect twice to form a loop. Line 9 opened on May 25, 2019. The line is 28.996 km (18.017 mi) in length. Line 10 opened on April 29, 2020. Line 4 opened on September 29, 2023. The western part of Line 3 opened on 30 December 2024.

== Lines ==
Shenyang Metro

| Line | Terminals (District) | | Commencement | Newest Extension | Length km | Stations |
|---|---|---|---|---|---|---|
| 1 | Shisanhaojie (Tiexi) | Shuangma (Hunnan) | September 27, 2010 | June 30, 2025 | 43.95 | 32 |
| 2 | Putianlu (Shenbei) | Taoxianjichang (Hunnan) | January 9, 2012 | September 29, 2023 | 45.58 | 33 |
| 3 | Lida (Tiexi) | Fangjialan (Shenhe) | December 30, 2024 | June 30, 2026 | 37 | 27 |
| 4 | Zhengxinlu (Dadong) | Chuangxinlu (Hunnan) | September 29, 2023 | － | 34.112 | 23 |
| 9 | Nujianggongyuan (Huanggu / Yuhong) | Jianzhudaxue (Hunnan) | May 25, 2019 | － | 28.996 | 23 |
| 10 | Dingxianghu (Yuhong) | Zhangshabu (Hunnan) | April 29, 2020 | － | 27.2 | 21 |
| Total | | | | | 218 | 144 |

== History ==
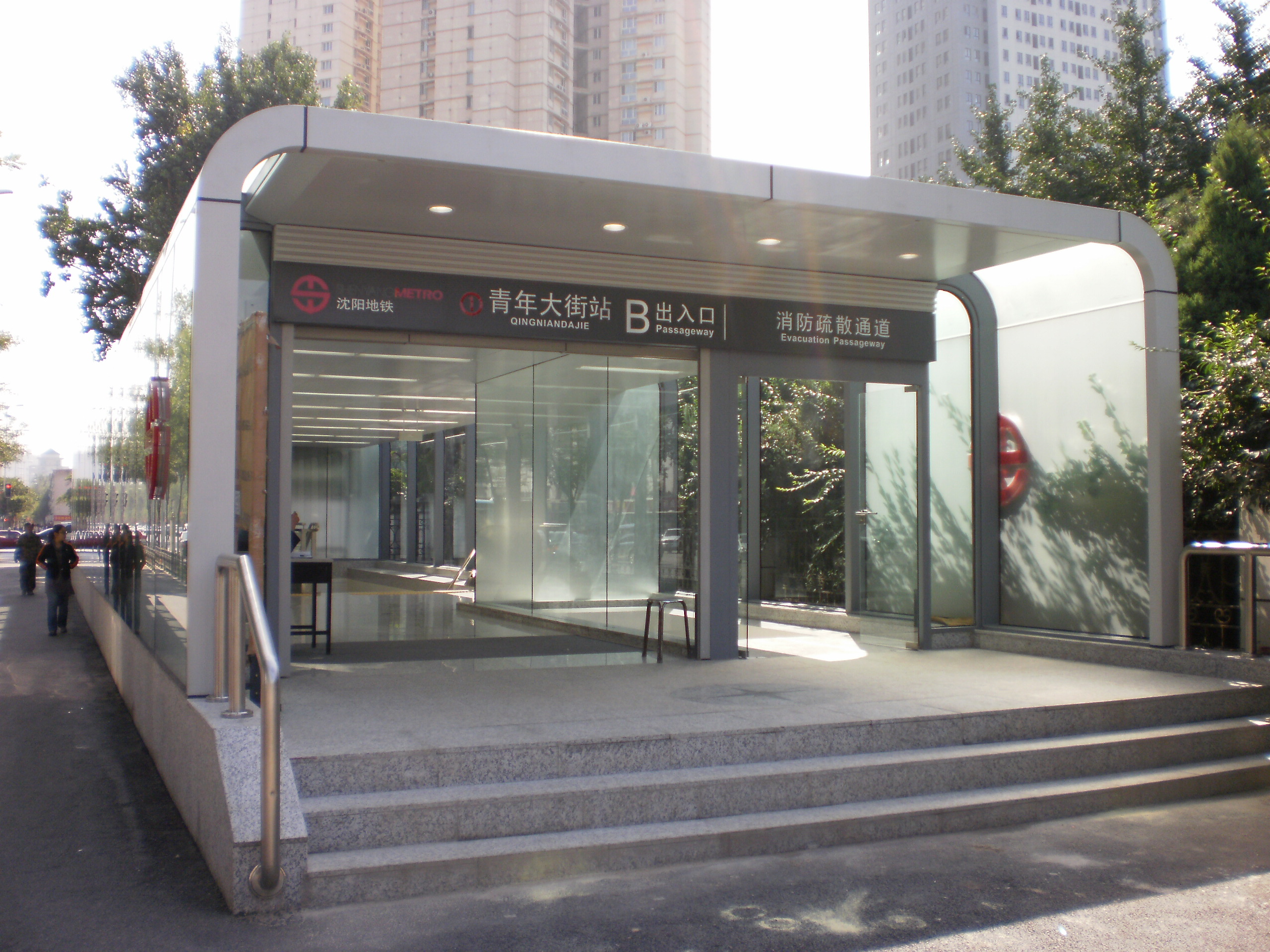
Street entrance of Qingniandajie station

Shenyang was one of the first Chinese cities with a metro plan. The initial plan of building a metro system in Shenyang was proposed as early as 1940, during the Manchukuo era with an Osaka-based company proposing a 52-kilometre (32 mi) metro network. However, chaos caused by the Second Sino-Japanese War and Chinese Civil Wars meant the plan was not implemented.

After the wars, the metro program was revived again when the Chinese government decided that the four biggest cities at that time, Beijing, Shanghai, Tianjin and Shenyang should build metro systems for transportation and military purposes. The subway was envisioned to also function as an air raid shelter in the event of a war.

Construction of the metro started in 1965 but was stopped shortly after due to the turmoil from the Cultural Revolution. Only the initial sections of the Beijing Subway and Tianjin Metro managed to be completed. Construction was restarted in 1974, on a line following today's Line 1. In 1978 government personnel from Harbin, Tianjin and Shanghai visited Shenyang to learn about the subway construction experience.

In 1982, subway construction was halted due to lack of funds and resources. The approximately 3 km (1.9 mi) long half completed tunnel was abandoned and filled with water. While the Shanghai Metro was put into service in 1995, the economic decline of Shenyang during the 1980s-1990s meant that there was no capital available for subway construction and the program was continually postponed.

A light rail system was designed in the early 1990s as a cheaper alternative, however this plan was also abandoned after a national suspension of subway projects was declared due to worries of high cost and financial debt.

Shenyang's economy revived in 2000, and with it growing traffic congestion and pollution caused by the expanding urban population. This prompted the Chinese central government to approve the subway proposal on November 8, 2005. Construction of the first phase of Line 1 started on November 18, 2005, with the entire phase opened on September 27, 2010, after trial operation in September 2009. The line have 22 stations and went from Shisanhaojie to Limingguangchang station. Line 2 started trail operation on December 30, 2011 and was fully opened on January 9, 2012. Line 2 extended three times in 2013, 2018 and 2023, and currently has 33 stations, connecting the downtown Shenyang and Taoxian Airport. Line 9 opened on May 25, 2019. Line 10 opened on April 29, 2020. Line 4 opened on September 29, 2023. The western part of Line 3 opened on 30 December 2024.

== Future development ==
There are three lines/extensions under construction.

| Planned opening | Route | Terminals | | Length (km) | Stations | Status |
|---|---|---|---|---|---|---|
| 2026 | 6 (Phase 1) | Yalujiangbeijie | Shaliulu | 27 | 23 | Under construction |
| 2028 | 9 (Eastern extension) | Jianzhudaxue | Shimiaozi | 7.7 | 5 | Under construction |
| 2029 | 10 (Southern extension) | Zhangshabu | Dingxiangjie | 24.5 | 16 | Under construction |

== See also ==
- List of metro systems
- Urban rail transit in China
