= Nujianggongyuan station =

Shenyang Metro station

Nujianggongyuan 怒江公园
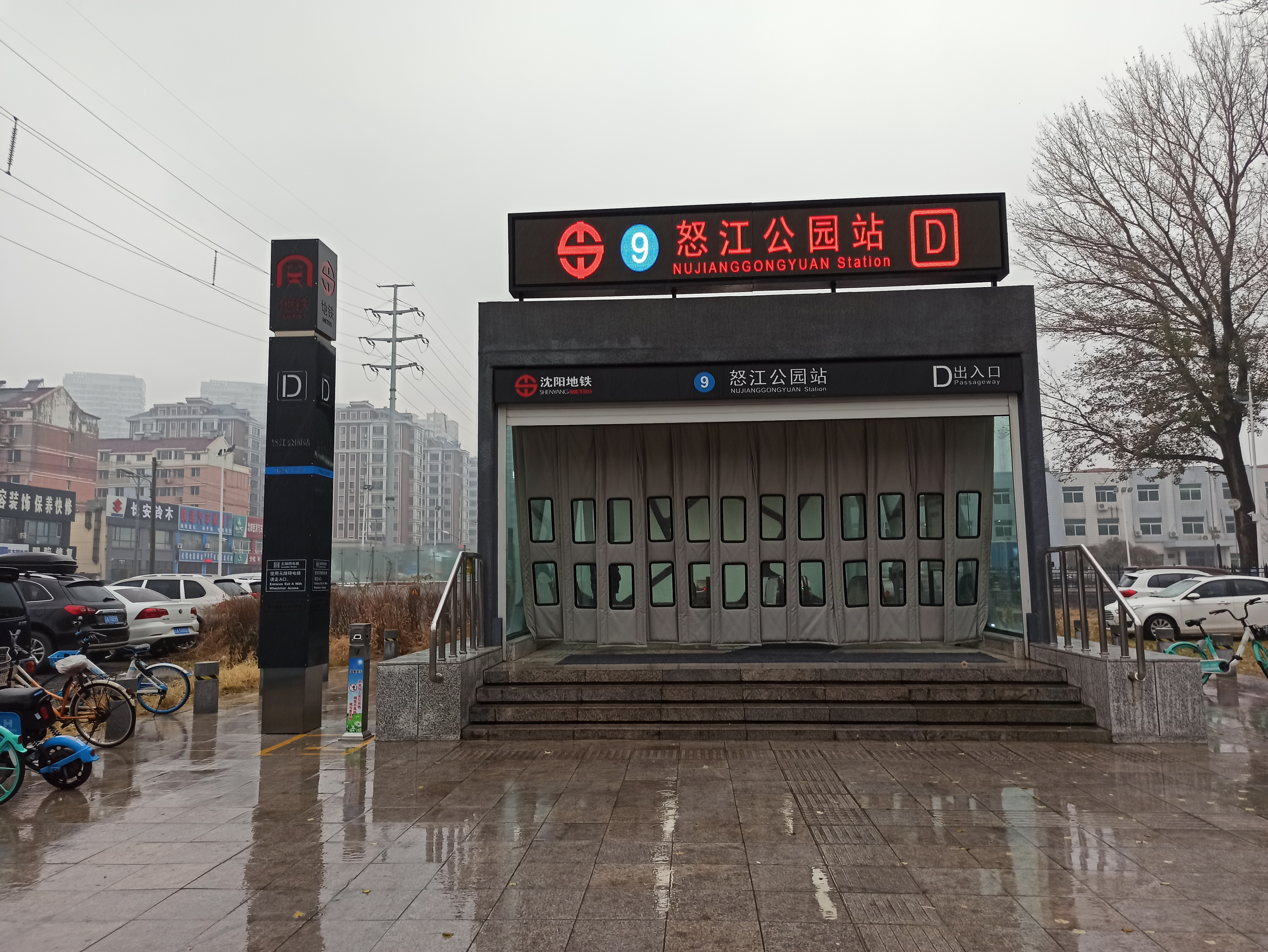

General information
- Location: Xijiang St. Yuhong District, Shenyang, Liaoning; China
- Coordinates: 41°50′25″N 123°22′59″E
- Operator: Shenyang Metro
- Line: Line 9
- Platforms: 2

Construction
- Structure type: Underground
- Accessible: Yes

History
- Opened: 25 May 2019; 7 years ago

Services
Preceding station	Shenyang Metro	Following station
Terminus	Line 9	Huaihejieshenyieryuan towards Jianzhudaxue
Location

Nujianggongyuan (Chinese: 怒江公园站; pinyin: Nùjiānggōngyuán Zhàn) is a station and the northern terminus on Line 9 of the Shenyang Metro, in Shenyang, Liaoning, China. The station opened on 25 May 2019.

== Station Layout ==
G	Entrances and Exits	Exits A-D
B1	Concourse	Faregates, Station Agent
B2	Northbound	← Line 9 termination track
B2	Island platform, doors open on the left
B2	Southbound	Line 9 towards Jianzhudaxue (Huaihejieshenyieryuan) →
