= Shifandaxue station =

Shenyang Metro station

Shifandaxue 师范大学 metro
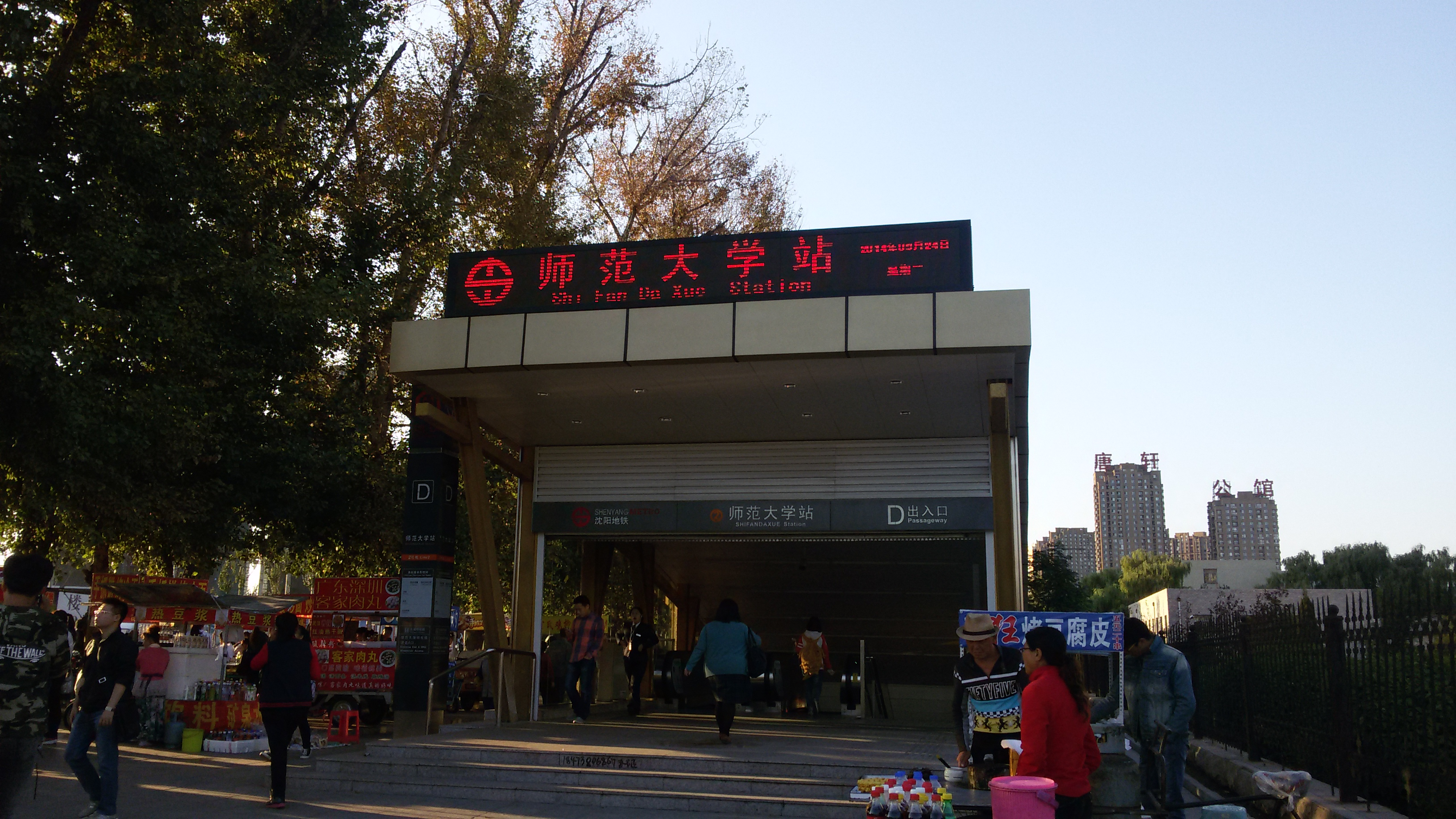
- Exit D

General information
- Location: Intersection of Daoyi South St. and Huanghe St. Shenbei New Area, Shenyang, Liaoning; China
- Operator: Shenyang Metro
- Line: Line 2
- Platforms: 2

Construction
- Structure type: Underground
- Accessible: Yes

Other information
- Station code: L2/21

History
- Opened: 30 December 2013; 12 years ago

Services
Preceding station	Shenyang Metro	Following station
Hangkonghangtiandaxue towards Putianlu	Line 2	Yixueyuan towards Taoxianjichang
Location

Shifandaxue (Chinese: 师范大学站; pinyin: Shīfàndàxué Zhàn) is a station on Line 2 of the Shenyang Metro. The station opened on 30 December 2013. The station is named for the nearby Shenyang Normal University.

== Station Layout ==
G	Entrances and Exits	Exits A-E
B1	Concourse	Faregates, Station Agent
B2	Northbound	← Line 2 towards Putianlu (Hangkonghangtiandaxue)
B2	Island platform, doors open on the left
B2	Southbound	Line 2 towards Taoxianjichang (Yixueyuan) →
