= Xinleyizhi station =

Shenyang Metro station

Xinleyizhi 新乐遗址 metro
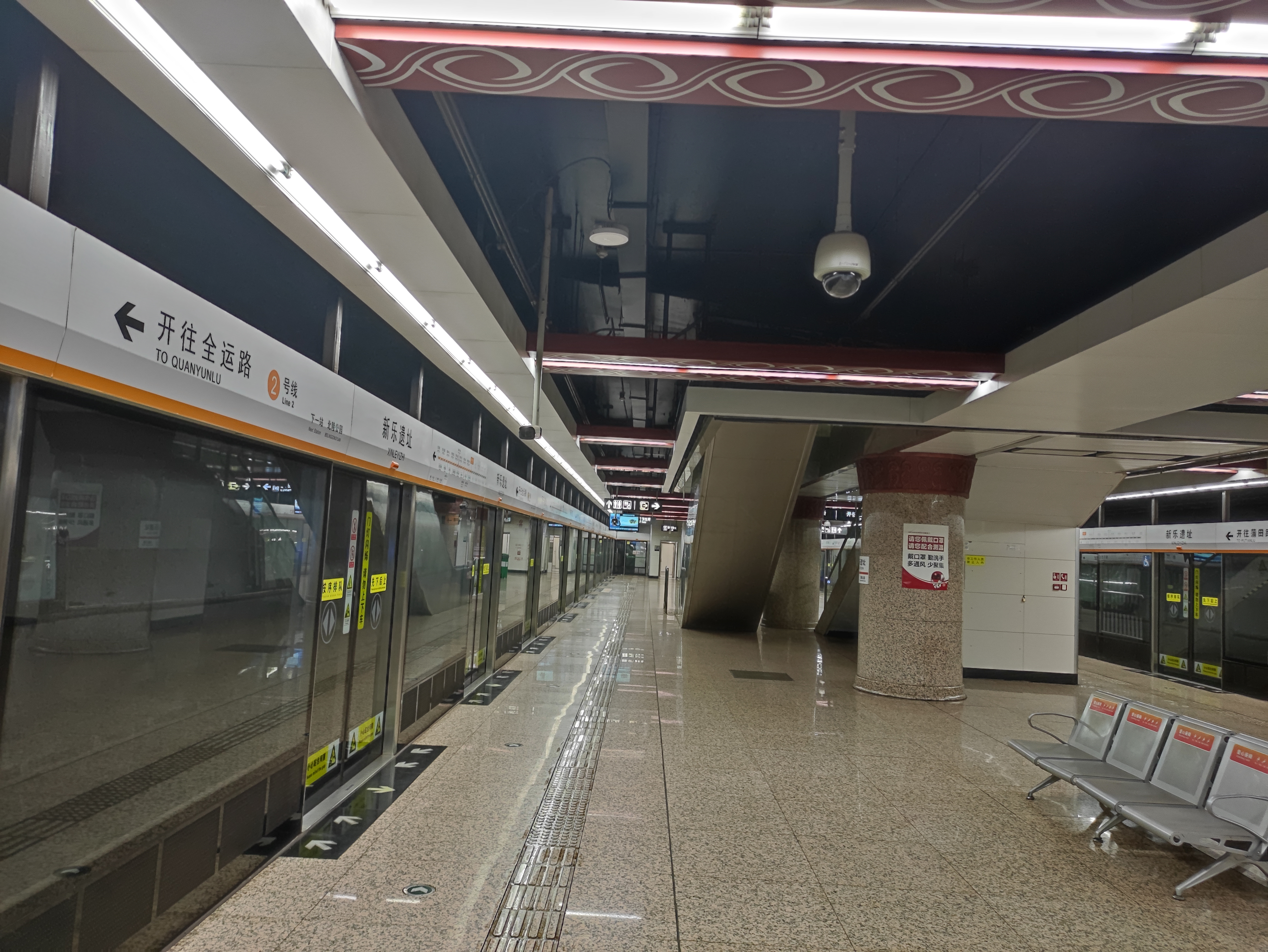
- Platform in July 2021

General information
- Location: Intersection of Huanghe North St. and Longshan Rd. Huanggu District, Shenyang, Liaoning; China
- Coordinates: 41°50′50″N 123°25′08″E
- Operator: Shenyang Metro
- Line: Line 2
- Platforms: 2

Construction
- Structure type: Underground
- Accessible: Yes

Other information
- Station code: L2/17

History
- Opened: 30 December 2011; 14 years ago

Services
Preceding station	Shenyang Metro	Following station
Lingxi towards Putianlu	Line 2	Beilinggongyuan towards Taoxianjichang
Location

Xinleyizhi (Chinese: 新乐遗址站; pinyin: Xīnyuèyízhǐ Zhàn) is a station on Line 2 of the Shenyang Metro. The station opened on 30 December 2011. This station locates to the west of the Qing Zhao Mausoleum and Beiling Park, also known as Zhaoling or Beiling, and close to the Museum of the Xinle Civilization.

== Station Layout ==
G	Entrances and Exits	Exits B-C
B1	Concourse	Faregates, Station Agent
B2	Northbound	← Line 2 towards Putianlu (Lingxi)
B2	Island platform, doors open on the left
B2	Southbound	Line 2 towards Taoxianjichang (Beilinggongyuan) →
