= Qishanlu station =

Shenyang Metro station

Qishanlu 岐山路 metro
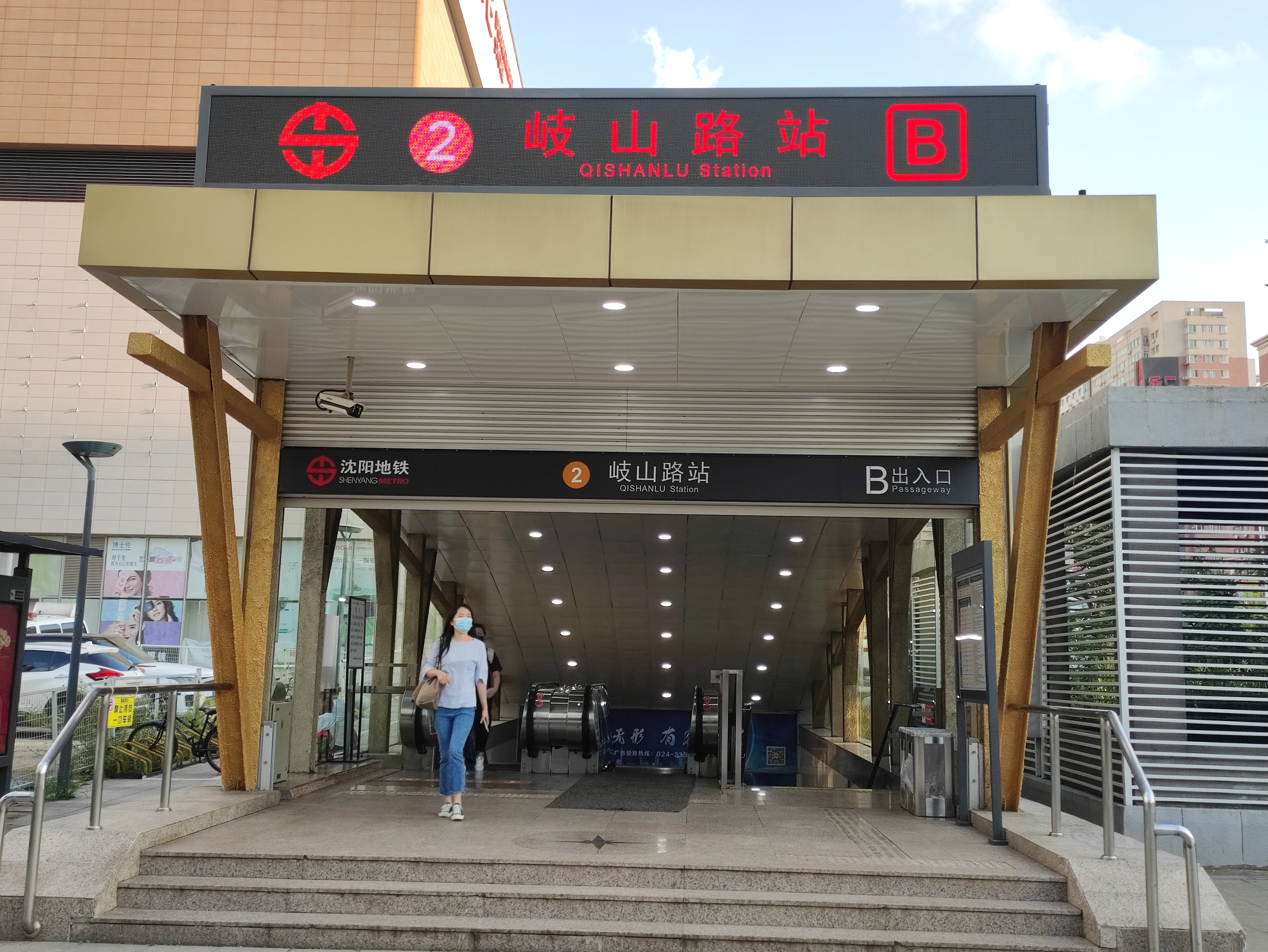
- Entrance B

General information
- Location: Intersection of Beiling St. and Qishan Rd. Huanggu District, Shenyang, Liaoning; China
- Coordinates: 41°49′22″N 123°25′45″E
- Operator: Shenyang Metro
- Line: Line 2
- Platforms: 2

Construction
- Structure type: Underground
- Accessible: Yes

Other information
- Station code: L2/14

History
- Opened: 30 December 2011; 14 years ago

Services
Preceding station	Shenyang Metro	Following station
Zhongyiyaodaxue towards Putianlu	Line 2	Shenyangbeizhan towards Taoxianjichang
Location

Qishanlu (Chinese: 岐山路站; pinyin: Qíshānlù Zhàn) is a station on Line 2 of the Shenyang Metro in Huanggu District in China. The station opened on 30 December 2011.

== Station Layout ==
G	Entrances and Exits	Exits A-D
B1	Concourse	Faregates, Station Agent
B2	Northbound	← Line 2 towards Putianlu (Zhongyiyaodaxue)
B2	Island platform, doors open on the left
B2	Southbound	Line 2 towards Taoxianjichang (Shenyangbeizhan) →
