= Santaizi station =

Shenyang Metro station

Santaizi 三台子 metro
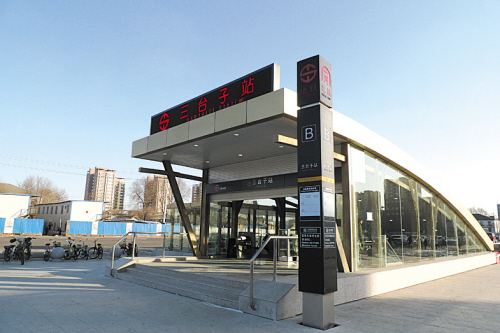
- Exit B

General information
- Location: Intersection of Huanghe North St. and Songshan Rd. Huanggu District, Shenyang, Liaoning; China
- Coordinates: 41°52′10″N 123°25′01″E
- Operator: Shenyang Metro
- Line: Line 2
- Platforms: 2

Construction
- Structure type: Underground
- Accessible: Yes

Other information
- Station code: L2/19

History
- Opened: 30 December 2011; 14 years ago

Services
Preceding station	Shenyang Metro	Following station
Yixueyuan towards Putianlu	Line 2	Lingxi towards Taoxianjichang
Location

Santaizi (Chinese: 三台子站; pinyin: Sāntáizi Zhàn) is a station on Line 2 of the Shenyang Metro. The station opened on 30 December 2011.

== Station Layout ==
G	Entrances and Exits	Exits A-C
B1	Concourse	Faregates, Station Agent
B2	Northbound	← Line 2 towards Putianlu (Yixueyuan)
B2	Island platform, doors open on the left
B2	Southbound	Line 2 towards Taoxianjichang (Lingxi) →
