= Hangkonghangtiandaxue station =

Shenyang Metro station

Hangkonghangtiandaxue 航空航天大学 metro
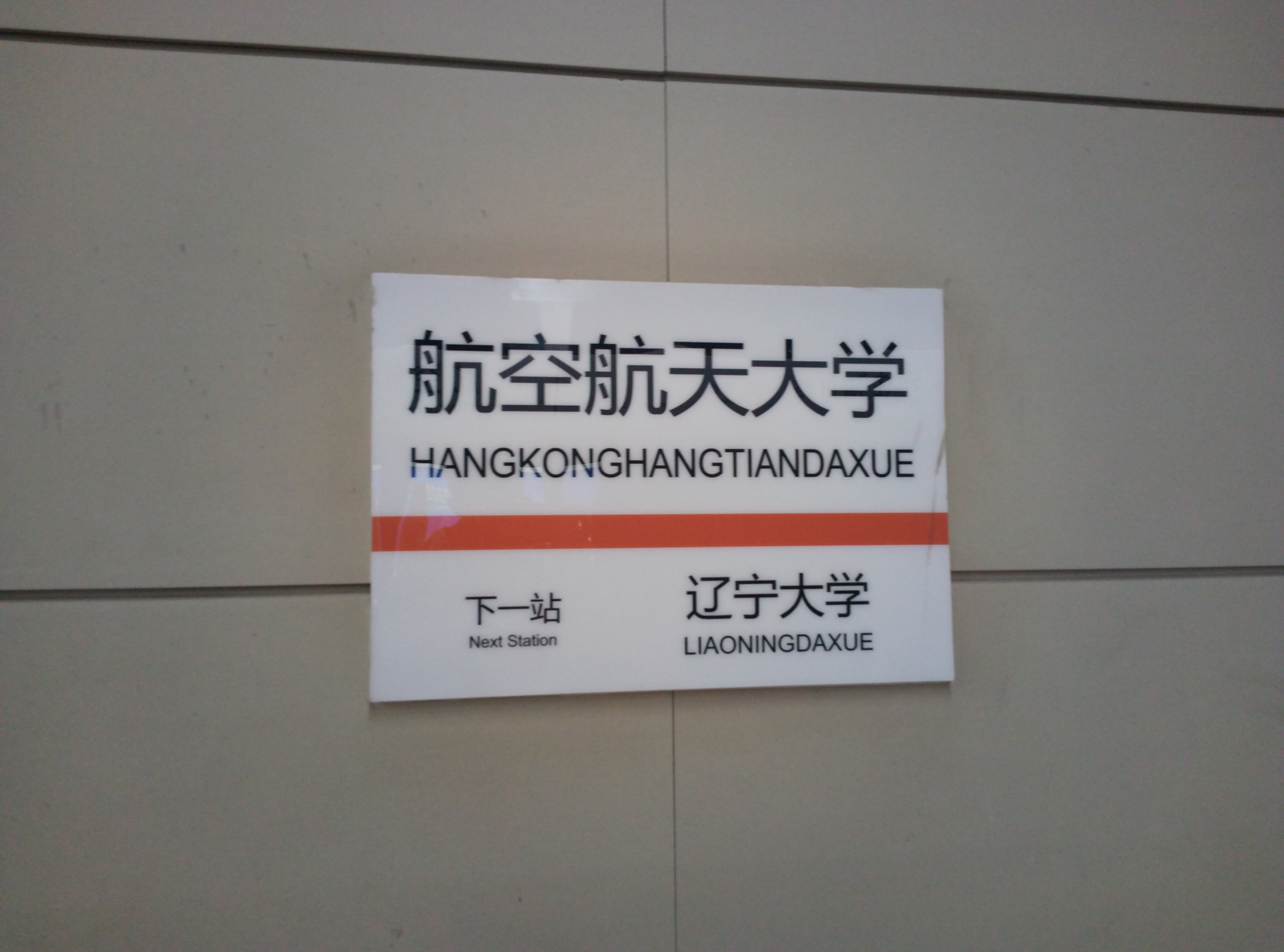
- Station sign

General information
- Location: Intersection of Daoyi South St. and Puchang Rd. Shenbei New Area, Shenyang, Liaoning; China
- Operator: Shenyang Metro
- Line: Line 2
- Platforms: 2

Construction
- Structure type: Underground
- Accessible: Yes

Other information
- Station code: L2/22

History
- Opened: 30 December 2013; 12 years ago

Services
Preceding station	Shenyang Metro	Following station
Liaoningdaxue towards Putianlu	Line 2	Shifandaxue towards Taoxianjichang
Location

Hangkonghangtiandaxue (Chinese: 航空航天大学站; pinyin: Hángkōnghángtiāndàxué Zhàn) is a station on Line 2 of the Shenyang Metro. The station opened on 30 December 2013. The station is named after the nearby Shenyang Aerospace University.

== Station Layout ==
G	Entrances and Exits	Exits A-C
B1	Concourse	Faregates, Station Agent
B2	Northbound	← Line 2 towards Putianlu (Liaoningdaxue)
B2	Island platform, doors open on the left
B2	Southbound	Line 2 towards Taoxianjichang (Shifandaxue) →
