= Yixueyuan station (Shenyang Metro) =

Shenyang Metro station

Yixueyuan 医学院 metro
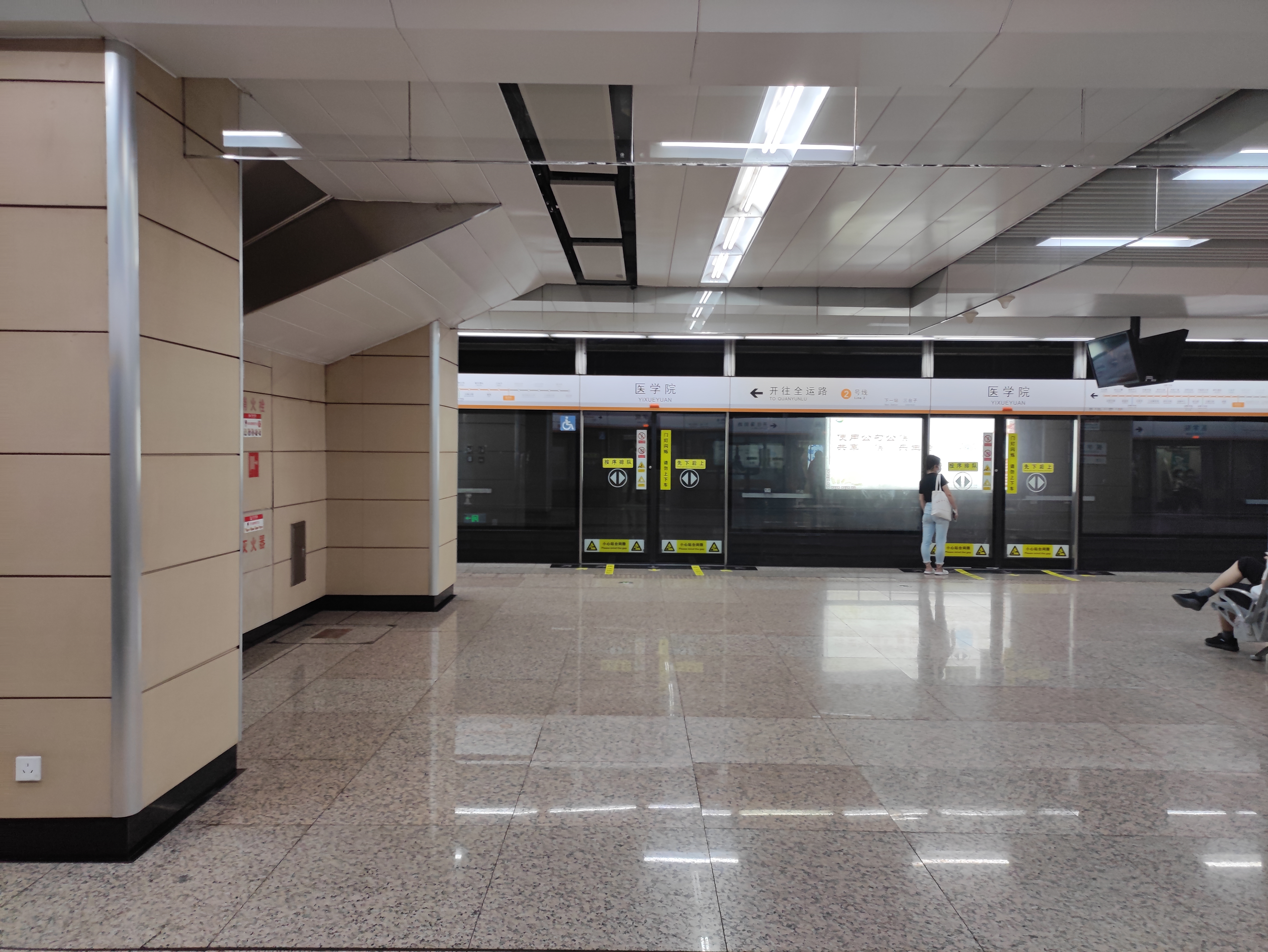

General information
- Location: Intersection of Huanghe North St. and Lushan Rd. Huanggu District, Shenyang, Liaoning; China
- Operator: Shenyang Metro
- Line: Line 2
- Platforms: 2

Construction
- Structure type: Underground
- Accessible: Yes

Other information
- Station code: L2/20

History
- Opened: 30 December 2013; 12 years ago

Services
Preceding station	Shenyang Metro	Following station
Shifandaxue towards Putianlu	Line 2	Santaizi towards Taoxianjichang
Location

Yixueyuan (Chinese: 医学院站; pinyin: Yīxuéyuàn Zhàn) is a station on Line 2 of the Shenyang Metro. The station opened on 30 December 2013.

== Station Layout ==
G	Entrances and Exits	Exits B-D
B1	Concourse	Faregates, Station Agent
B2	Northbound	← Line 2 towards Putianlu (Shifandaxue)
B2	Island platform, doors open on the left
B2	Southbound	Line 2 towards Taoxianjichang (Santaizi) →
