= Liaoningdaxue station =

Shenyang Metro station

Liaoningdaxue 辽宁大学 metro
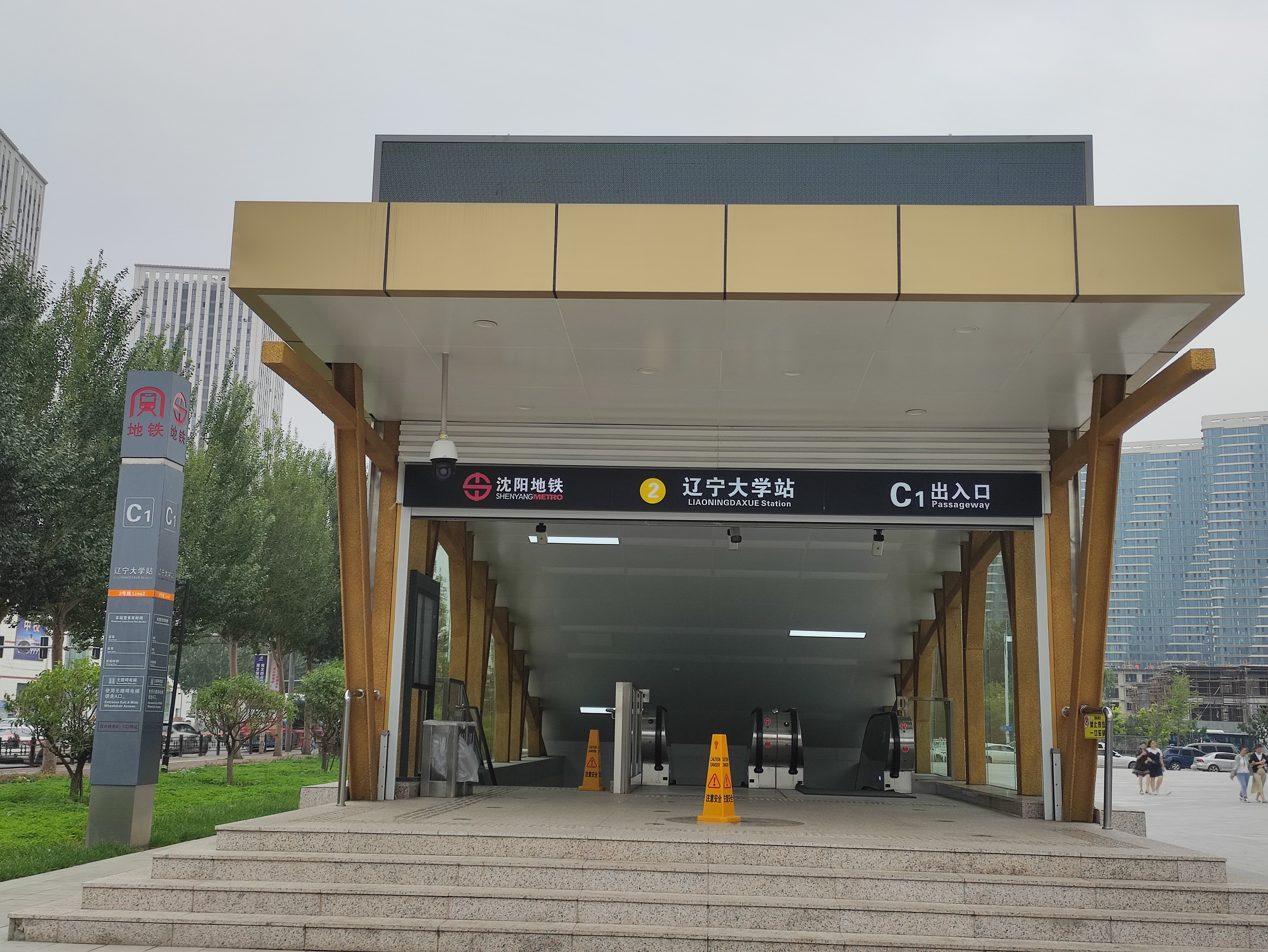
- Exit C1

General information
- Location: Intersection of Daoyi South St. and Puxin Rd. Shenbei New Area, Shenyang, Liaoning; China
- Coordinates: 41°56′07″N 123°23′27″E
- Operator: Shenyang Metro
- Line: Line 2
- Platforms: 2

Construction
- Structure type: Underground
- Accessible: Yes

Other information
- Station code: L2/23

History
- Opened: 8 April 2018; 8 years ago

Services
Preceding station	Shenyang Metro	Following station
Renjiehugongyuan towards Putianlu	Line 2	Hangkonghangtiandaxue towards Taoxianjichang
Location

Liaoningdaxue (Chinese: 辽宁大学站; pinyin: Liáoníngdàxué Zhàn) is a station on Line 2 of the Shenyang Metro. The station opened on 8 April 2018.

== Station Layout ==
G	Entrances and Exits	Exits A-D
B1	Concourse	Faregates, Station Agent
B2	Northbound	← Line 2 towards Putianlu (Renjiehugongyuan)
B2	Island platform, doors open on the left
B2	Southbound	Line 2 towards Taoxianjichang (Hangkonghangtiandaxue) →
