= Lingxi station =

Shenyang Metro station

Lingxi 陵西
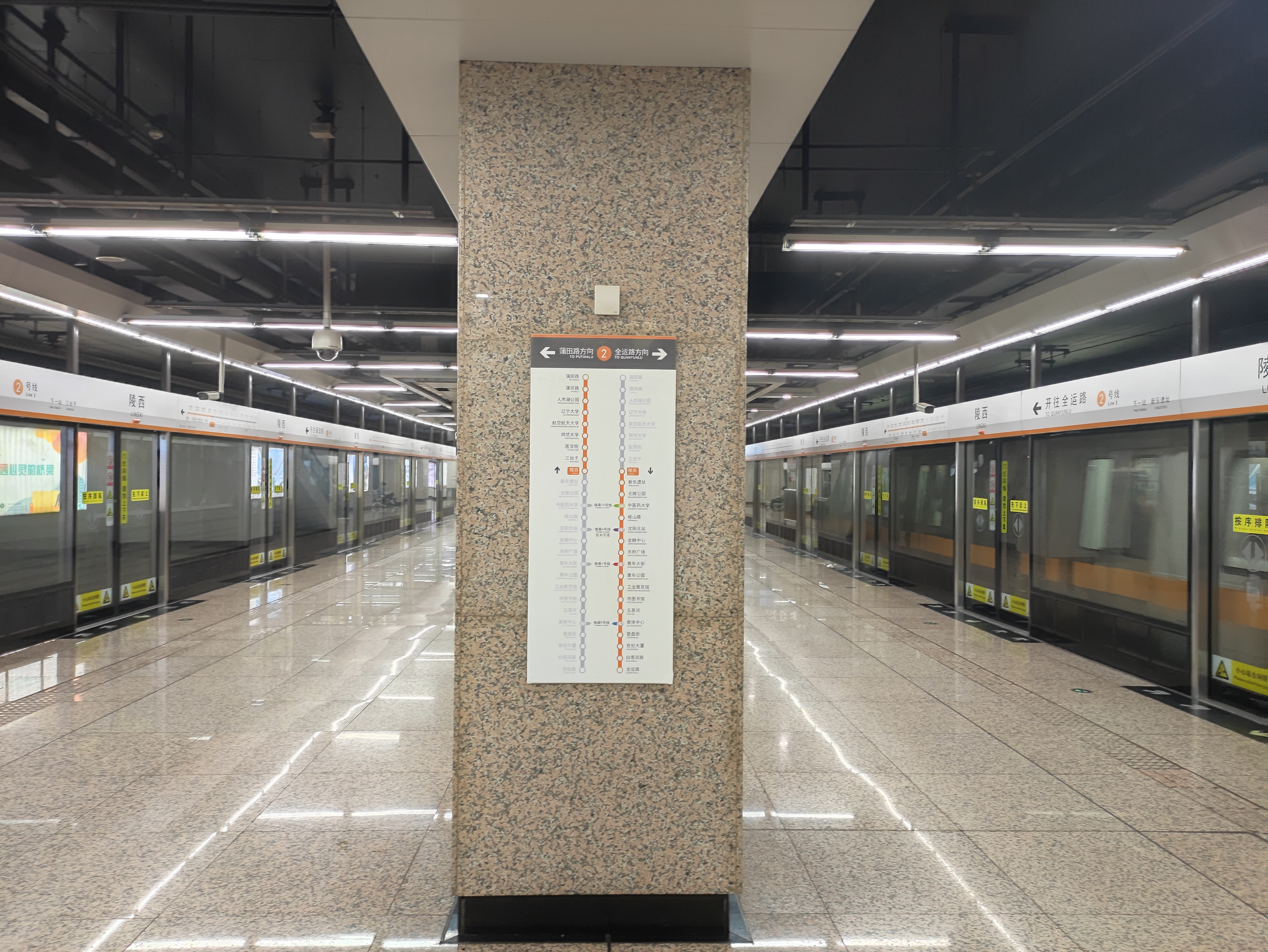
- Platform in August 2021

General information
- Location: Intersection of Huanghe North St. and Huangshan Rd. Huanggu District, Shenyang, Liaoning; China
- Coordinates: 41°51′18″N 123°25′06″E
- Operator: Shenyang Metro
- Line: Line 2
- Platforms: 2

Construction
- Structure type: Underground
- Accessible: Yes

Other information
- Station code: L2/18

History
- Opened: 30 December 2011; 14 years ago

Services
| Preceding station | Shenyang Metro | Following station |
|---|---|---|
| Santaizi towards Putianlu | Line 2 | Xinleyizhi towards Taoxianjichang |
Location

Lingxi (Chinese: 陵西站; pinyin: Língxī Zhàn) is a station on Line 2 of the Shenyang Metro. The station opened on 30 December 2011. This station locates at the west gate of the Qing Zhao Mausoleum and Beiling Park, also known as Zhaoling or Beiling.

== Station Layout ==
| G | Entrances and Exits | Exits A-C |
| B1 | Concourse | Faregates, Station Agent |
| B2 | Northbound | ← Line 2 towards Putianlu (Santaizi) |
| B2 | Island platform, doors open on the left |
| B2 | Southbound | Line 2 towards Taoxianjichang (Xinleyizhi) → |
