= Renjiehugongyuan station =

Shenyang Metro station

Renjiehugongyuan 人杰湖公园
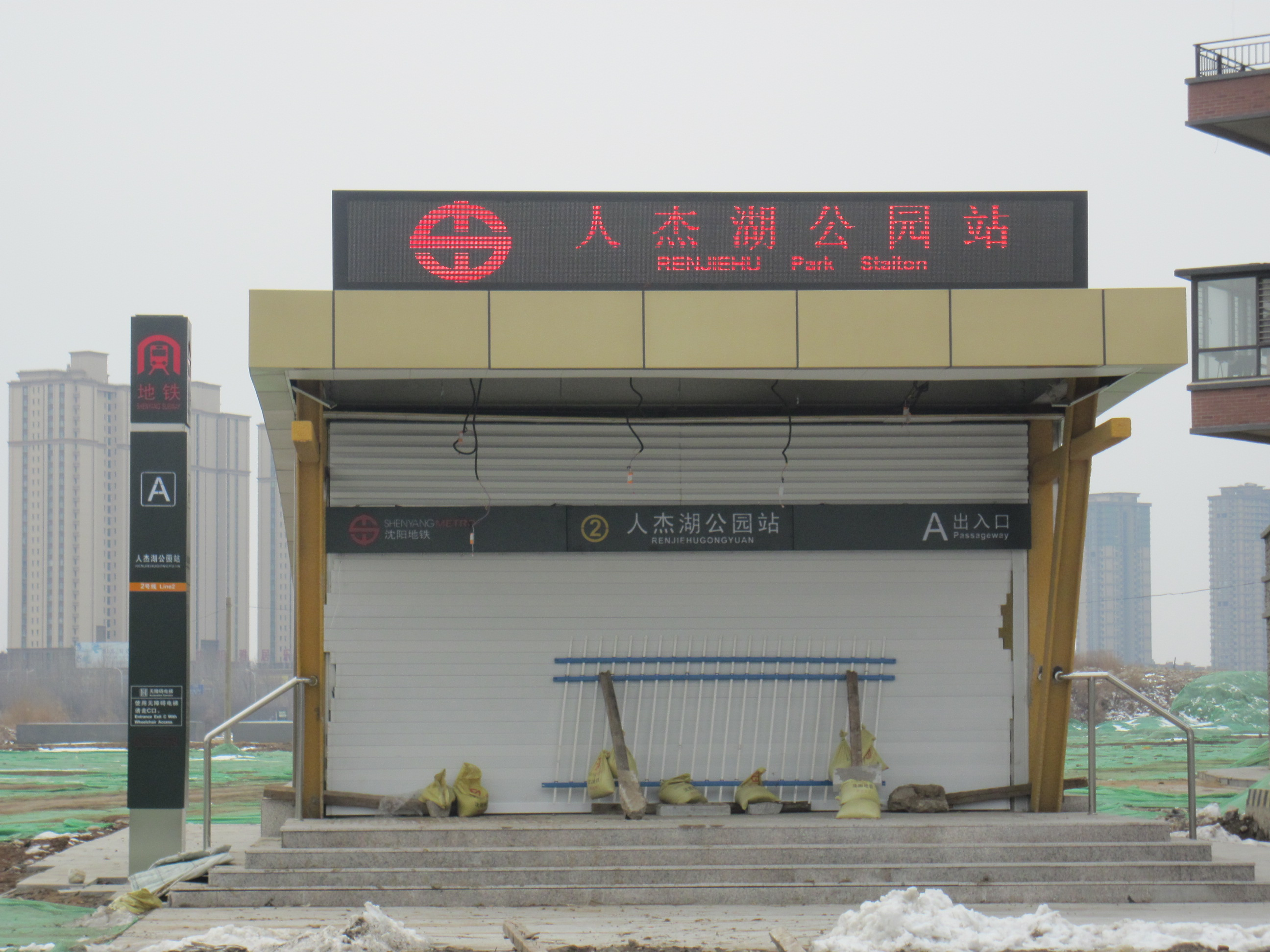
- Exit A

General information
- Location: Intersection of Pubei Rd. and Renhu West St. Shenbei New Area, Shenyang, Liaoning; China
- Coordinates: 41°56′28″N 123°23′46″E
- Operator: Shenyang Metro
- Line: Line 2
- Platforms: 2

Construction
- Structure type: Underground
- Accessible: Yes

Other information
- Station code: L2/24

History
- Opened: 8 April 2018; 8 years ago

Services
Preceding station	Shenyang Metro	Following station
Puhelu towards Putianlu	Line 2	Liaoningdaxue towards Taoxianjichang
Location

Renjiehugongyuan (Chinese: 人杰湖公园站; pinyin: Rénjiéhúgōngyuán Zhàn) is a station on Line 2 of the Shenyang Metro. The station opened on 8 April 2018.

== Station Layout ==
G	Entrances and Exits	Exits A-C
B1	Concourse	Faregates, Station Agent
B2	Northbound	← Line 2 towards Putianlu (Puhelu)
B2	Island platform, doors open on the left
B2	Southbound	Line 2 towards Taoxianjichang (Liaoningdaxue) →
