= Beilinggongyuan station =

Shenyang Metro station

Beilinggongyuan 北陵公园 metro
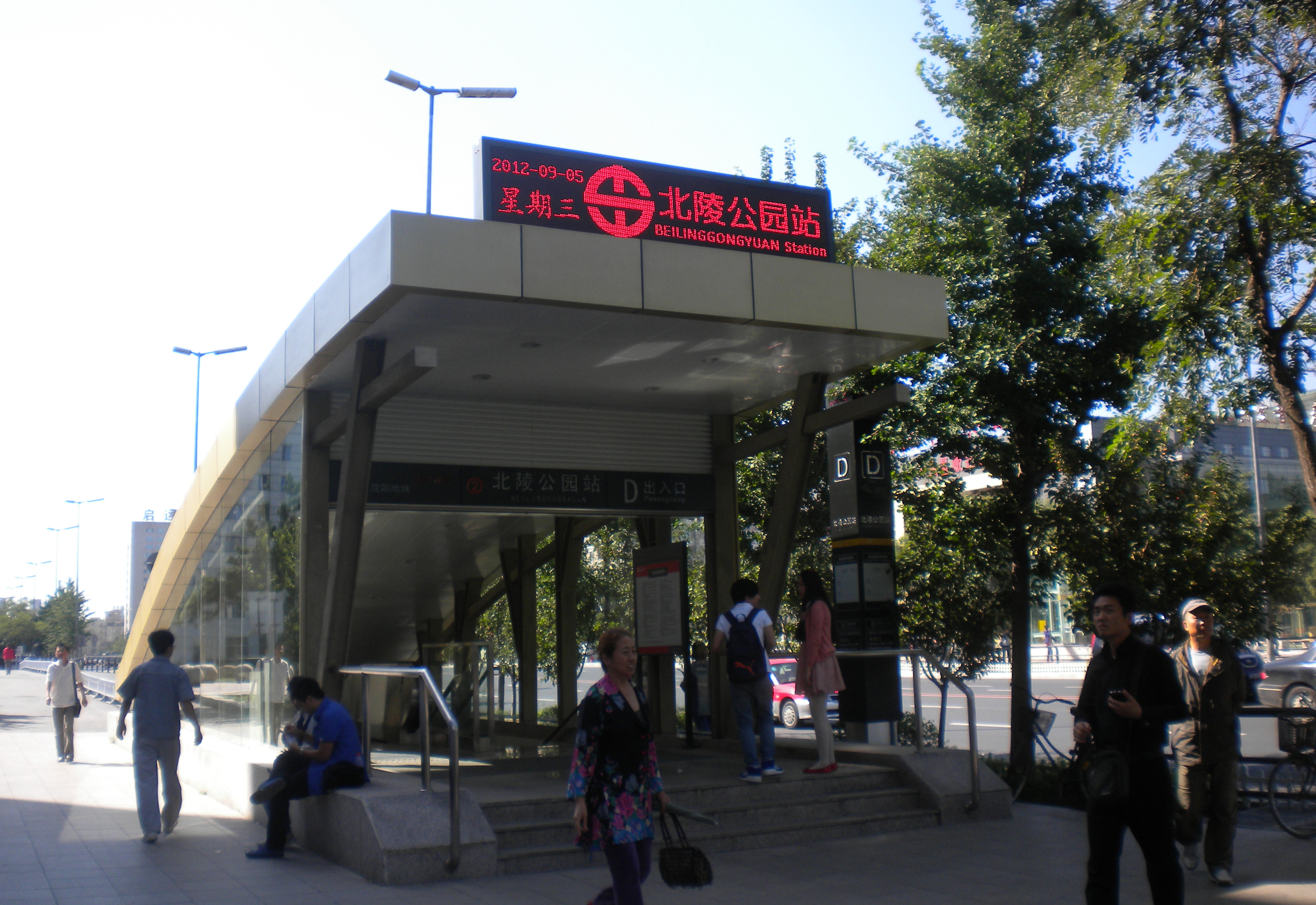
- Exit D

General information
- Location: Intersection of Huanghe North St. and Huangshan Rd. Huanggu District, Shenyang, Liaoning; China
- Coordinates: 41°51′18″N 123°25′06″E
- Operator: Shenyang Metro
- Line: Line 2
- Platforms: 2

Construction
- Structure type: Underground
- Accessible: Yes

Other information
- Station code: L2/16

History
- Opened: 30 December 2011; 14 years ago

Services
Preceding station	Shenyang Metro	Following station
Xinleyizhi towards Putianlu	Line 2	Zhongyiyaodaxue towards Taoxianjichang
Location

Beilinggongyuan (Chinese: 北陵公园站; pinyin: Běilínggōngyuán Zhàn) is a station on Line 2 of the Shenyang Metro. The station opened on 30 December 2011. This station locates at the south gate of the Qing Zhao Mausoleum and Beiling Park, also known as Zhaoling or Beiling.

== Station Layout ==
G	Entrances and Exits	Exits A-E
B1	Concourse	Faregates, Station Agent
B2	Northbound	← Line 2 towards Putianlu (Xinleyizhi)
B2	Island platform, doors open on the left
B2	Southbound	Line 2 towards Taoxianjichang (Zhongyiyaodaxue) →
