= Shitushuguan station =

Shenyang Metro station

Shitushuguan 市图书馆 metro
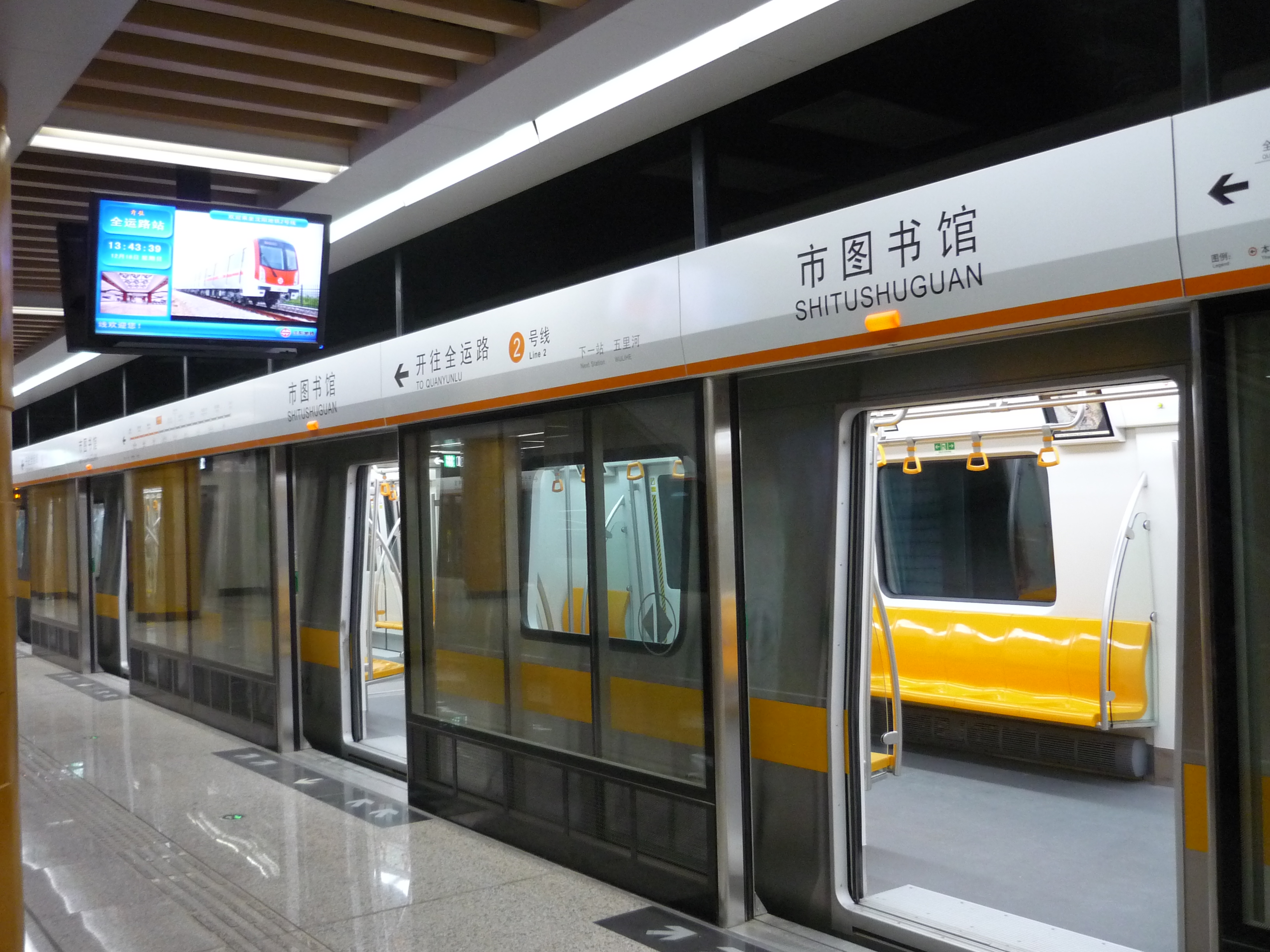
- Platform

General information
- Location: Intersection of Qingnian St. and Wenti Rd. Heping District, Shenyang, Liaoning; China
- Coordinates: 41°45′38″N 123°26′05″E
- Operator: Shenyang Metro
- Line: Line 2
- Platforms: 2

Construction
- Structure type: Underground
- Accessible: Yes

Other information
- Station code: L2/07

History
- Opened: 30 December 2011; 14 years ago

Services
Preceding station	Shenyang Metro	Following station
Gongyezhanlanguan towards Putianlu	Line 2	Wulihe towards Taoxianjichang
Location

Shitushuguan (Chinese: 市图书馆站; pinyin: Shìtúshūguǎn Zhàn) is a station on Line 2 of the Shenyang Metro. The station opened on 30 December 2011.

The under construction Line 6 will serve this station in the future.

== Station Layout ==
G	Entrances and Exits	Exits B-C
B1	Concourse	Faregates, Station Agent
B2	Northbound	← Line 2 towards Putianlu (Gongyezhanlanguan)
B2	Island platform, doors open on the left
B2	Southbound	Line 2 towards Taoxianjichang (Wulihe) →
