= Yingpanjie station =

Shenyang Metro station

Yingpanjie 营盘街 metro
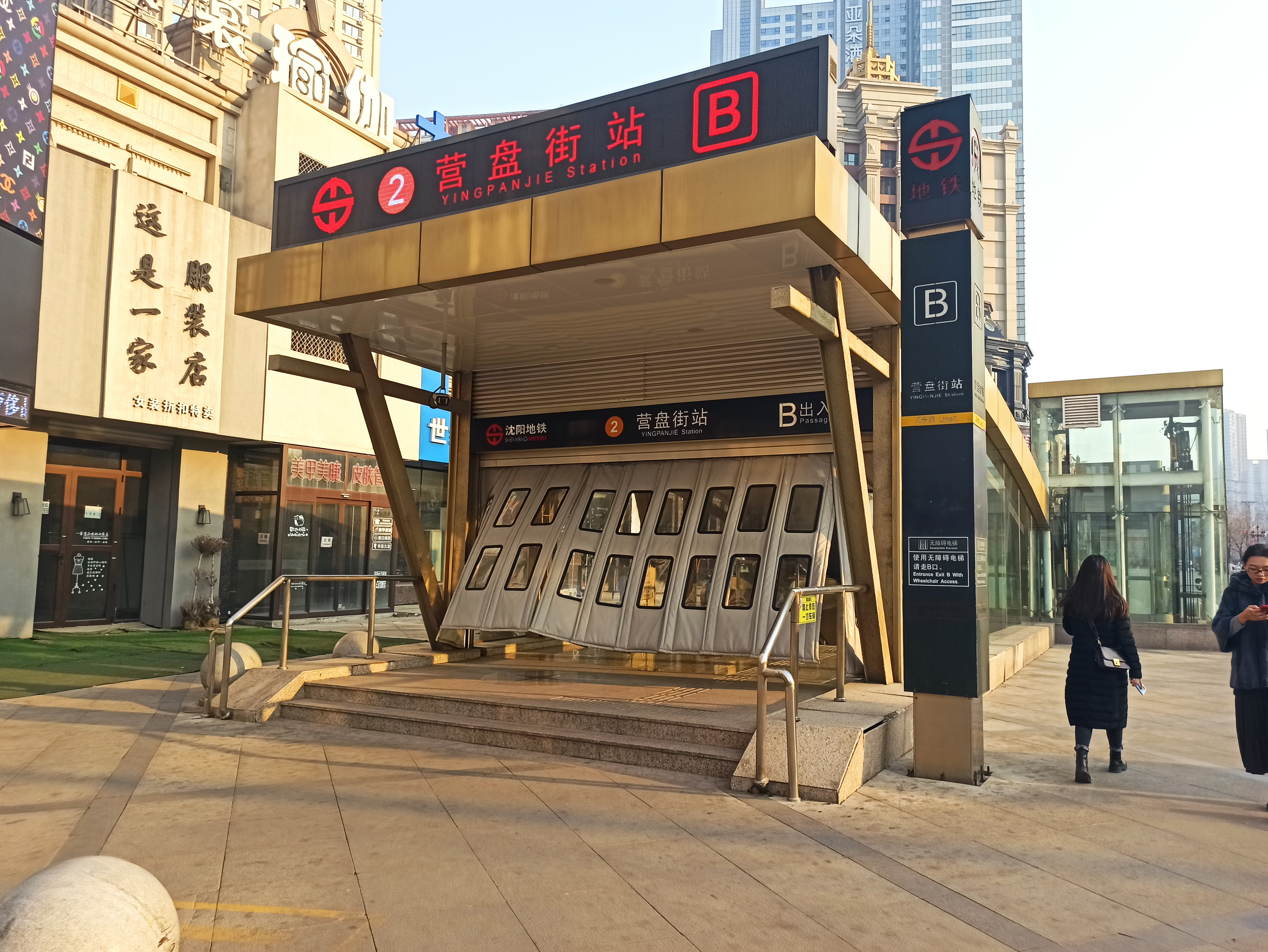
- Entrance B

General information
- Location: Intersection of Qingnian South St. and Yingpan South St. Hunnan District, Shenyang, Liaoning; China
- Coordinates: 41°43′53″N 123°27′21″E
- Operator: Shenyang Metro
- Line: Line 2
- Platforms: 2

Construction
- Structure type: Underground
- Accessible: Yes

Other information
- Station code: L2/04

History
- Opened: 30 December 2011; 14 years ago

Services
Preceding station	Shenyang Metro	Following station
Aotizhongxin towards Putianlu	Line 2	Shijidasha towards Taoxianjichang
Location

Yingpanjie (Chinese: 营盘街站; pinyin: Yíngpánjiē Zhàn) is a station on Line 2 of the Shenyang Metro. The station opened on 30 December 2011.

== Station Layout ==
G	Entrances and Exits	Exits A-D
B1	Concourse	Faregates, Station Agent
B2	Northbound	← Line 2 towards Putianlu (Aotizhongxin)
B2	Island platform, doors open on the left
B2	Southbound	Line 2 towards Taoxianjichang (Shijidasha) →
