= Baitahelu station =

Shenyang Metro station

Baitahelu 白塔河路 metro
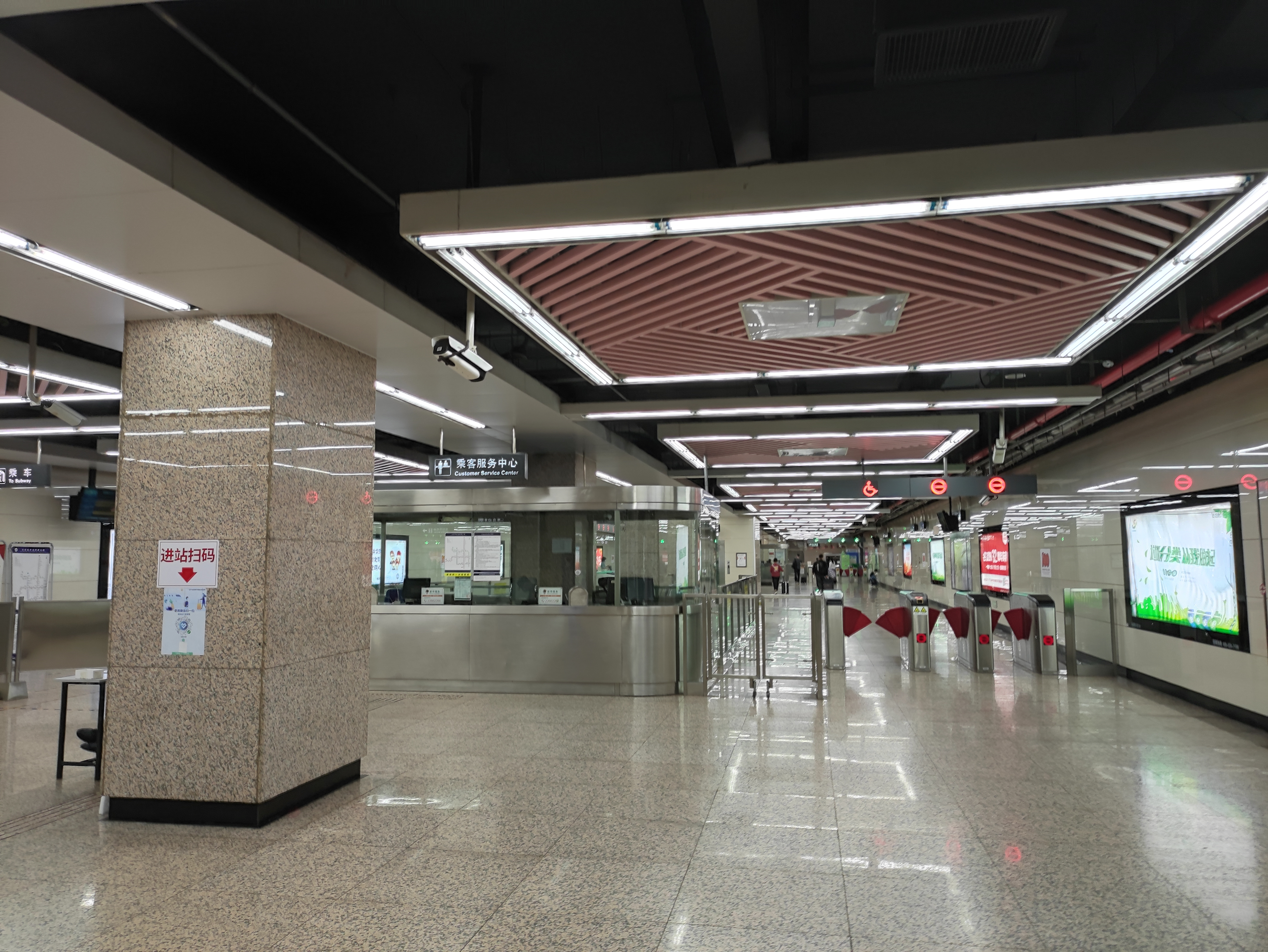
- Concourse in September 2021

General information
- Location: Intersection of Shenben Rd. and Baitahe Rd. Hunnan District, Shenyang, Liaoning; China
- Coordinates: 41°42′32″N 123°28′20″E
- Operator: Shenyang Metro
- Line: Line 2
- Platforms: 2

Construction
- Structure type: Underground
- Accessible: Yes

Other information
- Station code: L2/02

History
- Opened: 30 December 2011; 14 years ago

Services
Preceding station	Shenyang Metro	Following station
Shijidasha towards Putianlu	Line 2	Quanyunlu towards Taoxianjichang
Location

Baitahelu (Chinese: 白塔河路站; pinyin: Báitǎhélù Zhàn) is a station on Line 2 of the Shenyang Metro. The station opened on 30 December 2011.

== Station Layout ==
G	Entrances and Exits	Exits C-D
B1	Concourse	Faregates, Station Agent
B2	Northbound	← Line 2 towards Putianlu (Shijidasha)
B2	Island platform, doors open on the left
B2	Southbound	Line 2 towards Taoxianjichang (Quanyunlu) →
