= Jinrongzhongxin station =

Shenyang Metro station

Jinrongzhongxin 金融中心 metro
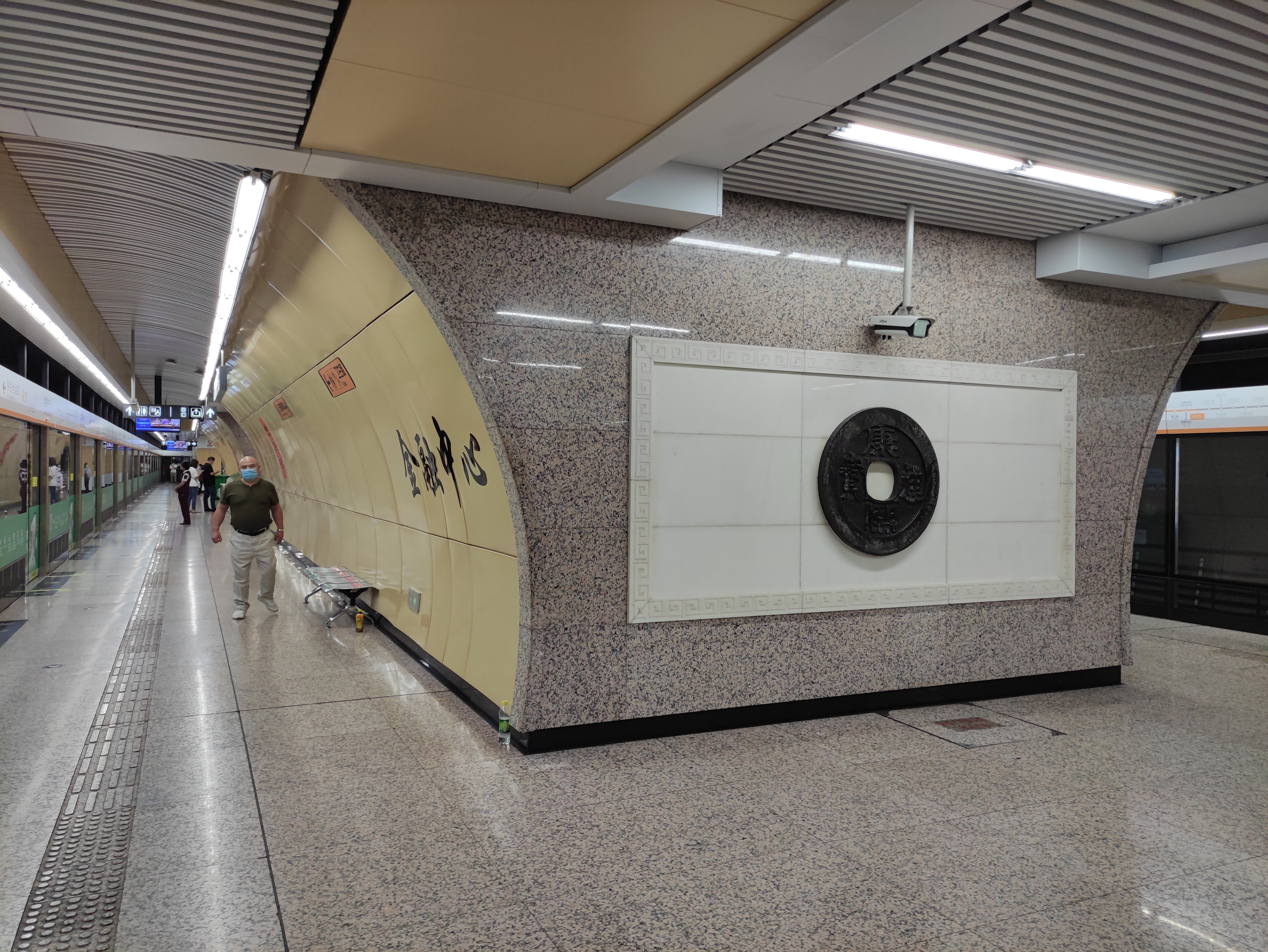
- Platform in August 2021

General information
- Location: Intersection of Harbin Rd. and Huigong St. Shenhe District, Shenyang, Liaoning; China
- Coordinates: 41°49′02″N 123°26′11″E
- Operator: Shenyang Metro
- Line: Line 2
- Platforms: 2

Construction
- Structure type: Underground
- Parking: Floor 8
- Accessible: Yes

Other information
- Station code: L2/12

History
- Opened: 30 December 2011; 14 years ago

Services
| Preceding station | Shenyang Metro | Following station |
|---|---|---|
| Shenyangbeizhan towards Putianlu | Line 2 | Renminguangchang towards Taoxianjichang |
Location

Jinrongzhongxin (Chinese: 金融中心站; pinyin: Jīnróngzhōngxīn Zhàn) is a station on Line 2 of the Shenyang Metro. The station opened on 30 December 2011.

== Station Layout ==
| G | Entrances and Exits | Exits A-D |
| B1 | Concourse | Faregates, Station Agent |
| B2 | Northbound | ← Line 2 towards Putianlu (Shenyangbeizhan) |
| B2 | Island platform, doors open on the left |
| B2 | Southbound | Line 2 towards Taoxianjichang (Renminguangchang) → |
