= People's Square station (Shenyang Metro) =

Shenyang Metro station

Renminguangchang 人民广场
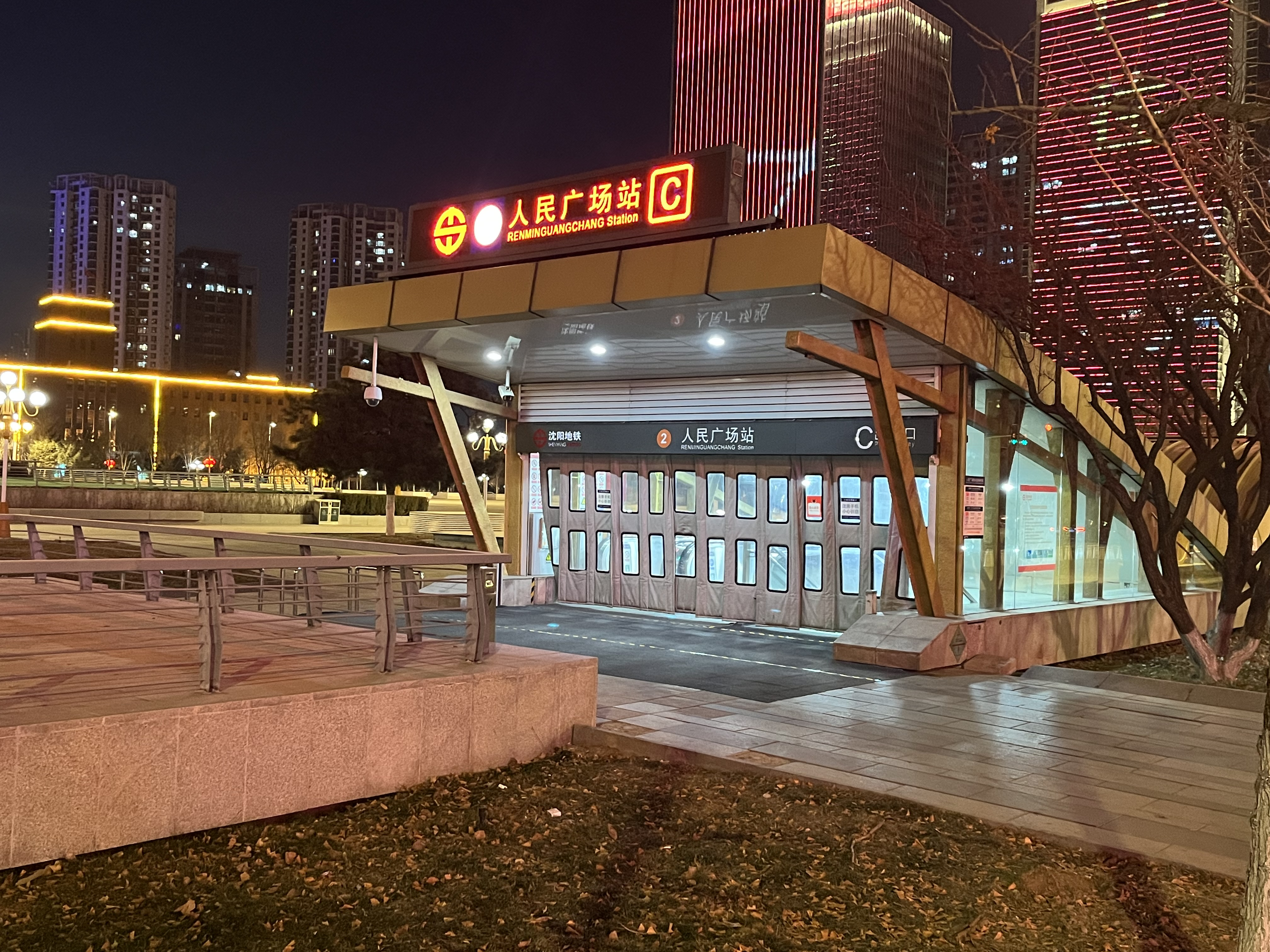
- One exit of Renminguangchang Station

General information
- Other names: Shifuguangchang (市府广场) (before 26 December 2024)
- Location: Shifuguangchang; Shenhe District, Shenyang, Liaoning; China
- Coordinates: 41°48′17″N 123°26′02″E
- Operator: Shenyang Metro
- Line: Line 2
- Platforms: 2

Construction
- Structure type: Underground
- Accessible: Yes

Other information
- Station code: L2/11

History
- Opened: 30 December 2011; 14 years ago

Services
Preceding station	Shenyang Metro	Following station
Jinrongzhongxin towards Putianlu	Line 2	Qingniandajie towards Taoxianjichang
Location

Renminguangchang (Chinese: 人民广场站; pinyin: Rénmínguǎngchǎng Zhàn) is a station on Line 2 of the Shenyang Metro.

The station opened on 30 December 2011 as Shifuguangchang (市府广场), it has renamed in 26 December 2024.

== Station Layout ==
G	Entrances and Exits	Exits A-D
B1	Concourse	Faregates, Station Agent
B2	Northbound	← Line 2 towards Putianlu (Jinrongzhongxin)
B2	Island platform, doors open on the left
B2	Southbound	Line 2 towards Taoxianjichang (Qingniandajie) →
