= Zhao Mausoleum (Qing dynasty) =

Coordinates: 41°50′59.54″N 123°25′17.80″E

Zhaoling Tomb of the Qing Dynasty
UNESCO World Heritage Site
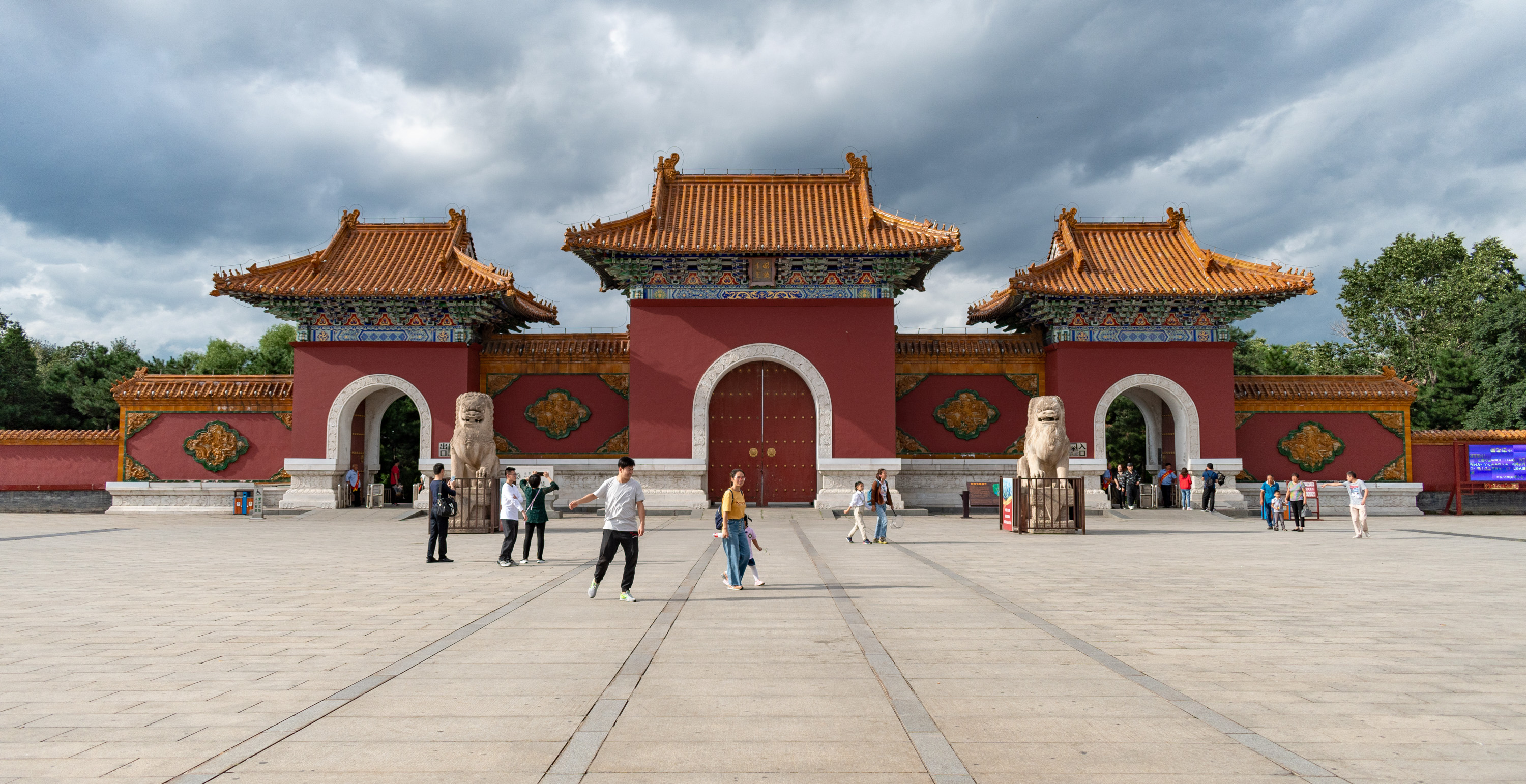
- "Da Hong Men," the Red Gate of the tomb

- Location within Liaoning Location within China
- Location: Huanggu, Shenyang, Liaoning, China
- Part of: Imperial Tombs of the Ming and Qing Dynasties
- Criteria: Cultural: (i)(ii)(iii)(iv)(vi)
- Reference: 1004ter-014
- Inscription: 2000 (24th Session)
- Extensions: 2003, 2004
- Area: 47.89 ha (118.3 acres)
- Buffer zone: 318.74 ha (787.6 acres)

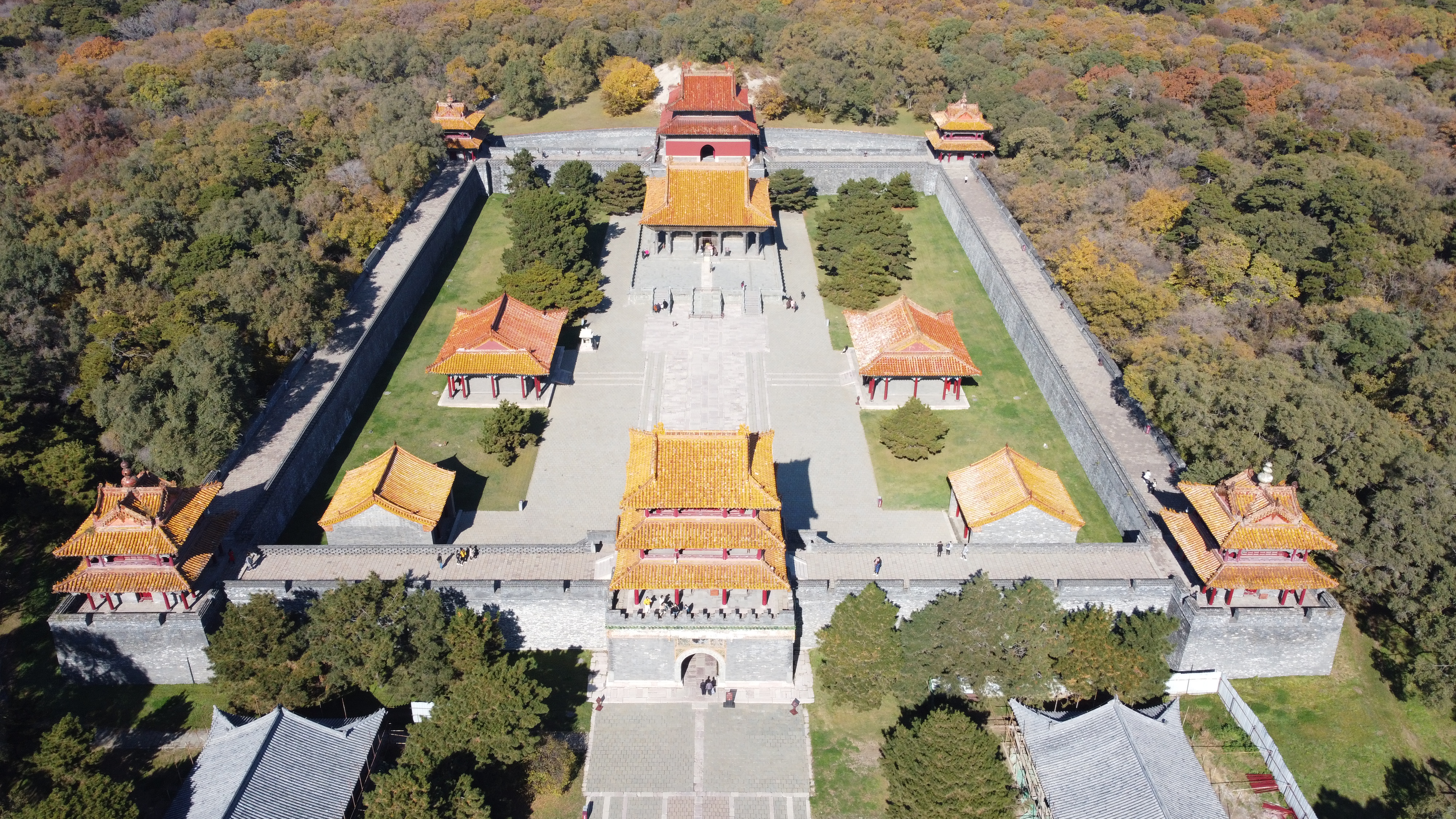
Bird's-eye view of the mausoleum

Zhaoling (Chinese: 昭陵; pinyin: Zhàolíng; lit. 'luminous mausoleum'; Manchu: ᡝᠯᡩᡝᠩᡤᡝ
ᠮᡠᠩᡤᠠᠨ, romanized: eldengge munggan), also known as Beiling (Chinese: 北陵; pinyin: Běilíng; lit. 'North Mausoleum') is the tomb of the first Qing emperor, Hong Taiji, and his Empress Xiaoduanwen.

The tomb is located within Beiling Park, in Huanggu District of the northern urban Shenyang, Liaoning province, and is a popular area attraction. The tomb complex took eight years (between 1643 and 1651) to build and has a row of animal statues leading to it. The tomb and surrounding park cover an area of 3,300,000 square metres making it the largest of the three imperial tombs north of the great wall. The area around the tomb was originally set aside for imperial use and ordinary people were forbidden entry. This forbidden area was opened to the public in 1928 and now forms Shenyang's Beiling Park (simplified Chinese: 北陵公园; traditional Chinese: 北陵公園; pinyin: Běilíng Gōngyuán).

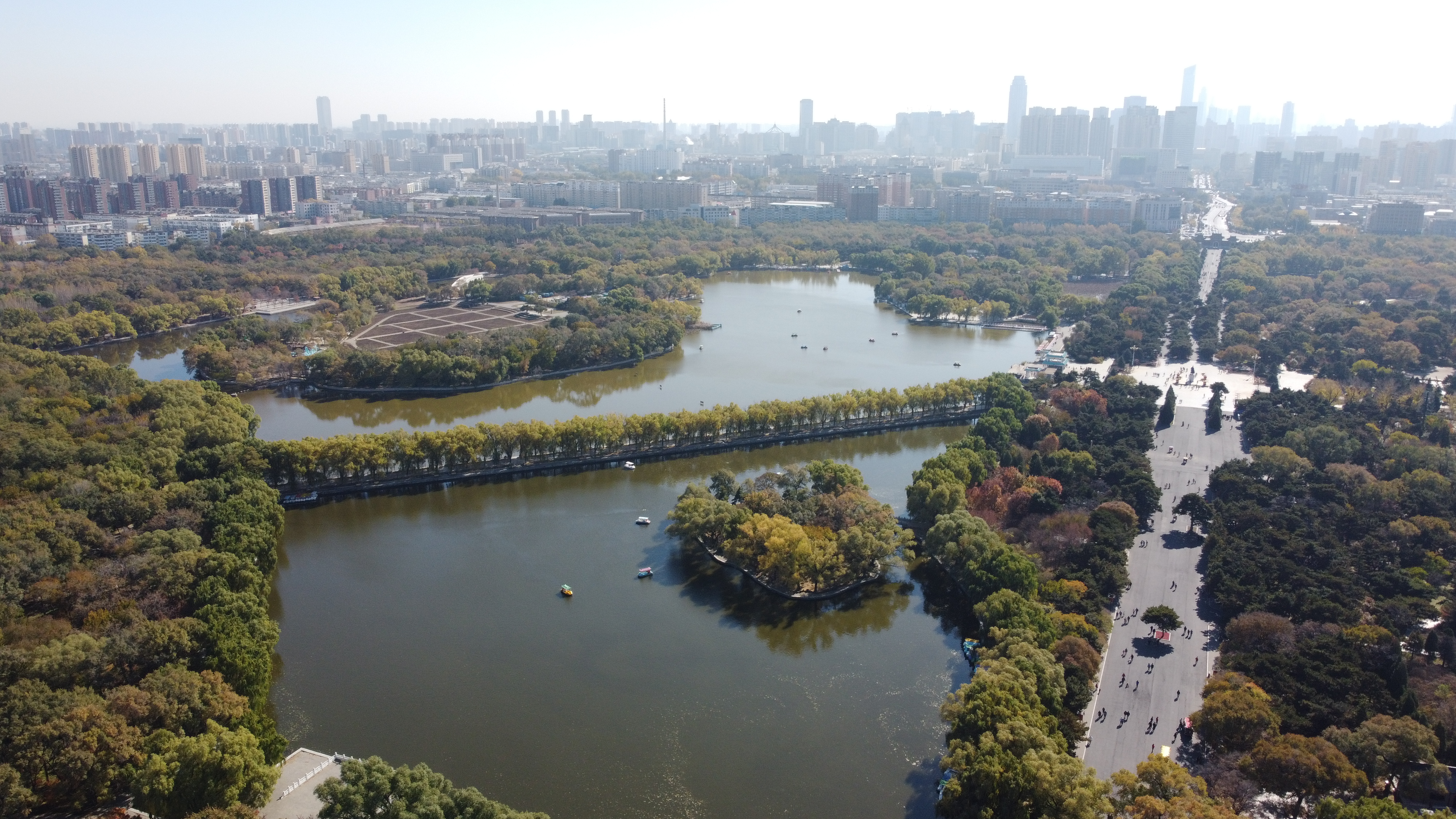
Lake inside the Beiling Park for leisure and the skyline of Shenyang

The Beiling Park has an area of 330 hectares (820 acres), and contains many historic buildings, pine trees and lakes. In 1927, Government of the Fengtian Province (later renamed Liaoning Province) established the park, which includes Zhaoling and surrounding area. West of the tomb are flower gardens and east are several lakes. There is also a Children's Garden within the park.

== Description ==
The site is aligned on a north–south axis set west of Shenyang city's old north axis. This access forms the sacred way of about 1.2 km that leads from the park gate to the tomb buildings. The way itself is made in three paths. The centre path was for the deities only or bearers of offerings. The path of the lefthand (west) of the sacred way was for the ruling emperor and the righthand (east) path was for officials and imperial staff. Halfway along the royal way stands a statue of Hong Taiji in a bold stance and wearing military dress. To either side lie extensive park lands of forest and lakes. At the northern end of the royal way, the route crosses a bridge over a lake beyond which stand a series of gates that mark the entrance to the inner tomb area.

The first gate is made of marble with ornate carvings. Heavy steel supports have been added to the front and back of this gate to prevent it falling over. The second gate takes you through the walls that surround the tomb. The royal way continues through forested land. A pair of stone pillars mark the beginning of the inner tomb structures. To either side of the route stand four pairs of stone animals. These are two xiezhi (mythical beasts that could tell good from evil. Here they represent the justice of the Emperor), two qilin (representing peace and kindness), two white horses, and lastly two camels. Beyond these guardians, the way is blocked by a small building inside which is a large stele. This stele tells of the deeds done by the dead emperor. It is mounted on top of a large statue of a turtle. After this, to either side of the way stand four buildings. These were used by the emperor and his staff to prepare themselves and their offerings before their ceremony to honor the past emperor.

Three stations of Shenyang Metro Line 2 serve this area: Beiling Gongyuan Station, Lingxi Station, and Xinle Yizhi Station.

=== Main temple complex ===
After these stands the main temple complex. This is a walled area within which the ceremonies for worshiping the emperor were carried out. The tomb mound and underground palace stand in a semi-circular walled area north of the temple area. The temple walls are high, with a walkway set on top of them. Each corner is marked with a small tower and two larger towers stand over the north and south gates of the temple area. Within the temple complex's walls stand five buildings. The first four, set on either side of the central axis, were used for preparing the ceremony.

At the northern end of the temple area, on top of the central axis, stands the altar building. It was here that the rites of worship were carried out. The building houses representations of the dead emperor. In front of the altar building, the emperor and his household would make offerings to their ancestors. To the south west of the altar stands a small stone structure in which offerings, after being presented on the altar, would be burnt.

Beyond the altar building, a final gate leads out of the temple area to the wall of the tomb mound itself. The underground tomb remains sealed, its contents hidden from view. Within lies Emperor Hong Taiji, and his consorts along with a multitude of priceless offerings.
