= Gongyezhanlanguan station =

Shenyang Metro station

Gongyezhanlanguan 工业展览馆 metro
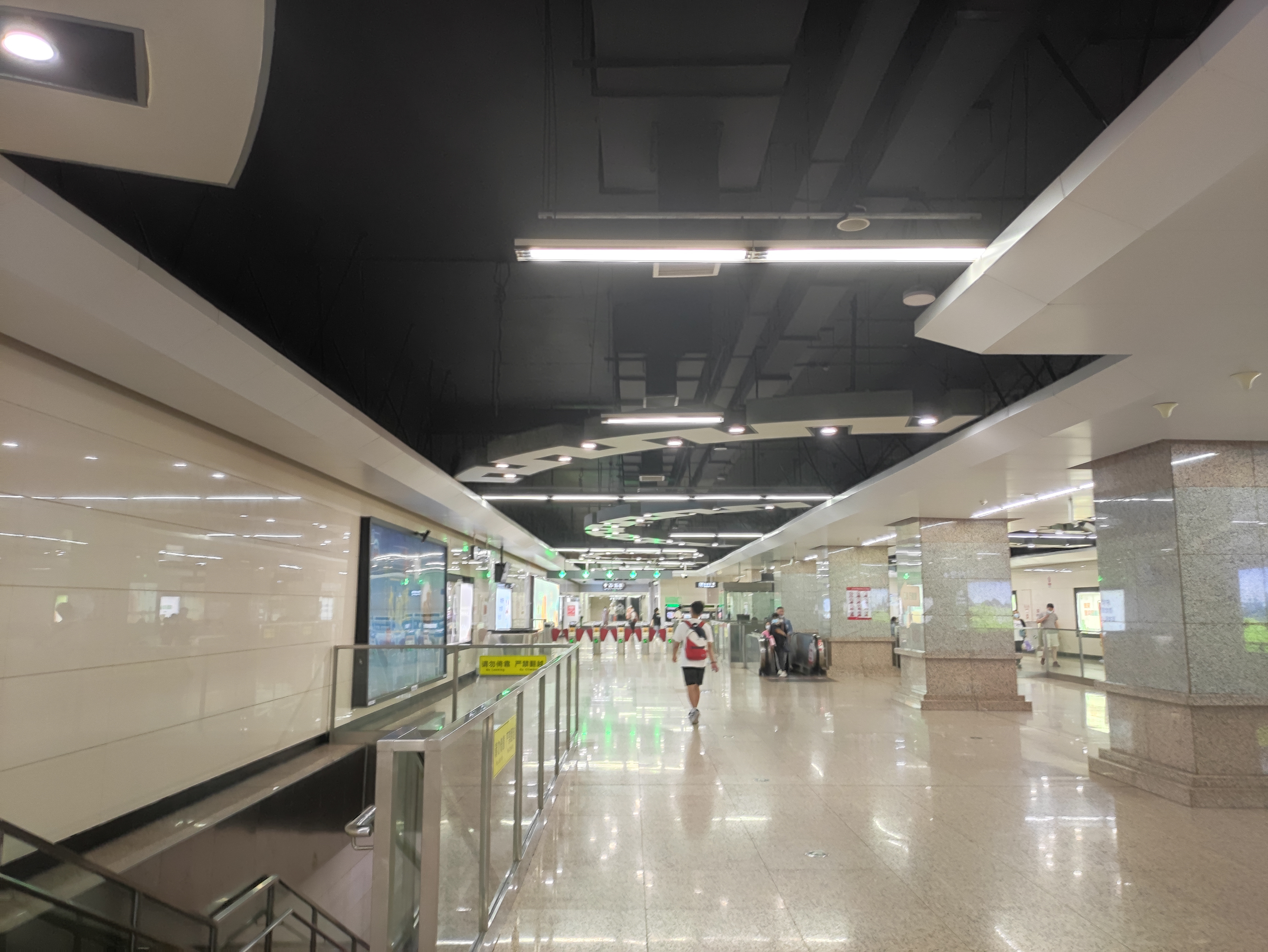
- Line 2 concourse (August 2021)

General information
- Location: Intersection of Qingnian St. and Wenhua Rd. Heping District, Shenyang, Liaoning; China
- Coordinates: 41°46′17″N 123°26′07″E
- Operator: Shenyang Metro
- Lines: Line 2 Line 3
- Platforms: 2

Construction
- Structure type: Underground
- Accessible: Yes

Other information
- Station code: L2/08

History
- Opened: 30 December 2011; 14 years ago (Line 2); 30 June 2026; 55 days ago (Line 3)

Services
Preceding station	Shenyang Metro	Following station
Qingniangongyuan towards Putianlu	Line 2	Shitushuguan towards Taoxianjichang
Sanhaojie towards Lida	Line 3	Zhongkeyuanjinshusuo towards Fangjialan
Location

Gongyezhanlanguan (Chinese: 工业展览馆站; pinyin: Gōngyèzhǎnlǎn Zhàn) is a station on Line 2 and Line 3 of the Shenyang Metro. The Line 2 station opened on 30 December 2011. The Line 3 station opened on 30 June 2026.

== Station Layout ==
G	Entrances and Exits	Exits B-C
B1	Concourse	Faregates, Station Agent
B2 (Line 2)		Station Equipment
B2 (Line 3)	Westbound	← Line 3 towards Lida (Sanhaojie)
B2 (Line 3)	Island platform, doors open on the left
B2 (Line 3)	Eastbound	Line 3 towards Fangjialan (Zhongkeyuanjinshusuo) →
B3	Northbound	← Line 2 towards Putianlu (Qingniangongyuan)
B3	Island platform, doors open on the left
B3	Southbound	Line 2 towards Taoxianjichang (Shitushuguan) →
