= Quanyunlu station =

Shenyang Metro station

Quanyunlu 全运路 metro
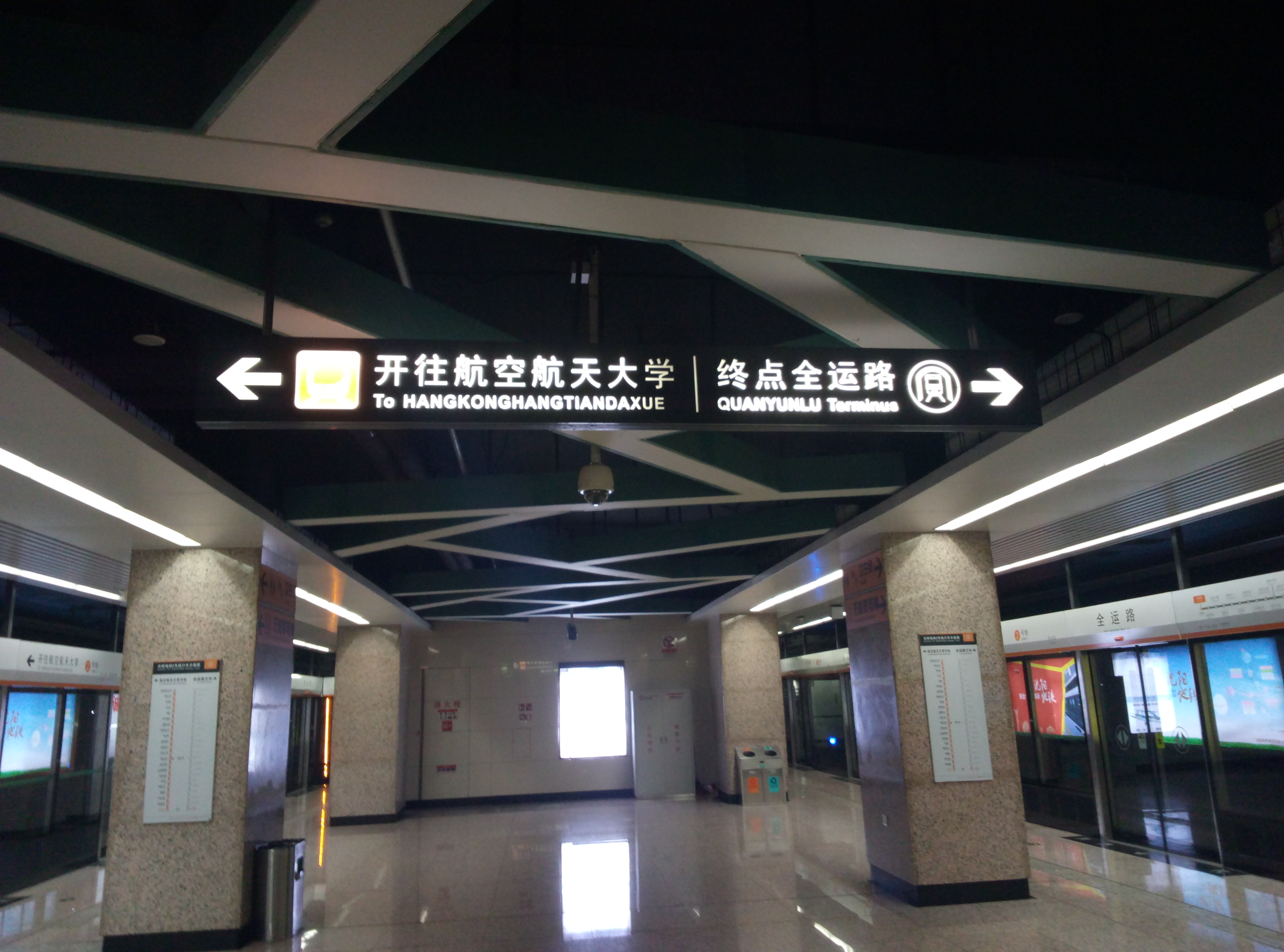
- Platform in December 2017

General information
- Location: Shendan Highway; Hunnan District, Shenyang, Liaoning; China
- Coordinates: 41°42′27″N 123°28′58″E
- Operator: Shenyang Metro
- Line: Line 2
- Platforms: 2

Construction
- Structure type: Underground
- Accessible: Yes

Other information
- Station code: L2/01

History
- Opened: 30 December 2011; 14 years ago

Services
Preceding station	Shenyang Metro	Following station
Baitahelu towards Putianlu	Line 2	Shenbendajie towards Taoxianjichang
Location

Quanyunlu (Chinese: 全运路站; pinyin: Quányùnlù Zhàn) is a station on Line 2 of the Shenyang Metro. The station opened on 30 December 2011.It was the southern terminus of Line 2 until the Phase 2 extension to Taoxianjichang opened on 29 September 2023.

== Station Layout ==
G	Concourse	Exits A-B, Faregates, Station Agent
B1	Northbound	← Line 2 towards Putianlu (Baitahelu)
B1	Island platform, doors open on the left
B1	Southbound	Line 2 towards Taoxianjichang (Shenbendajie) →
