= Shijidasha station =

Shenyang Metro station

Shijidasha 世纪大厦 metro
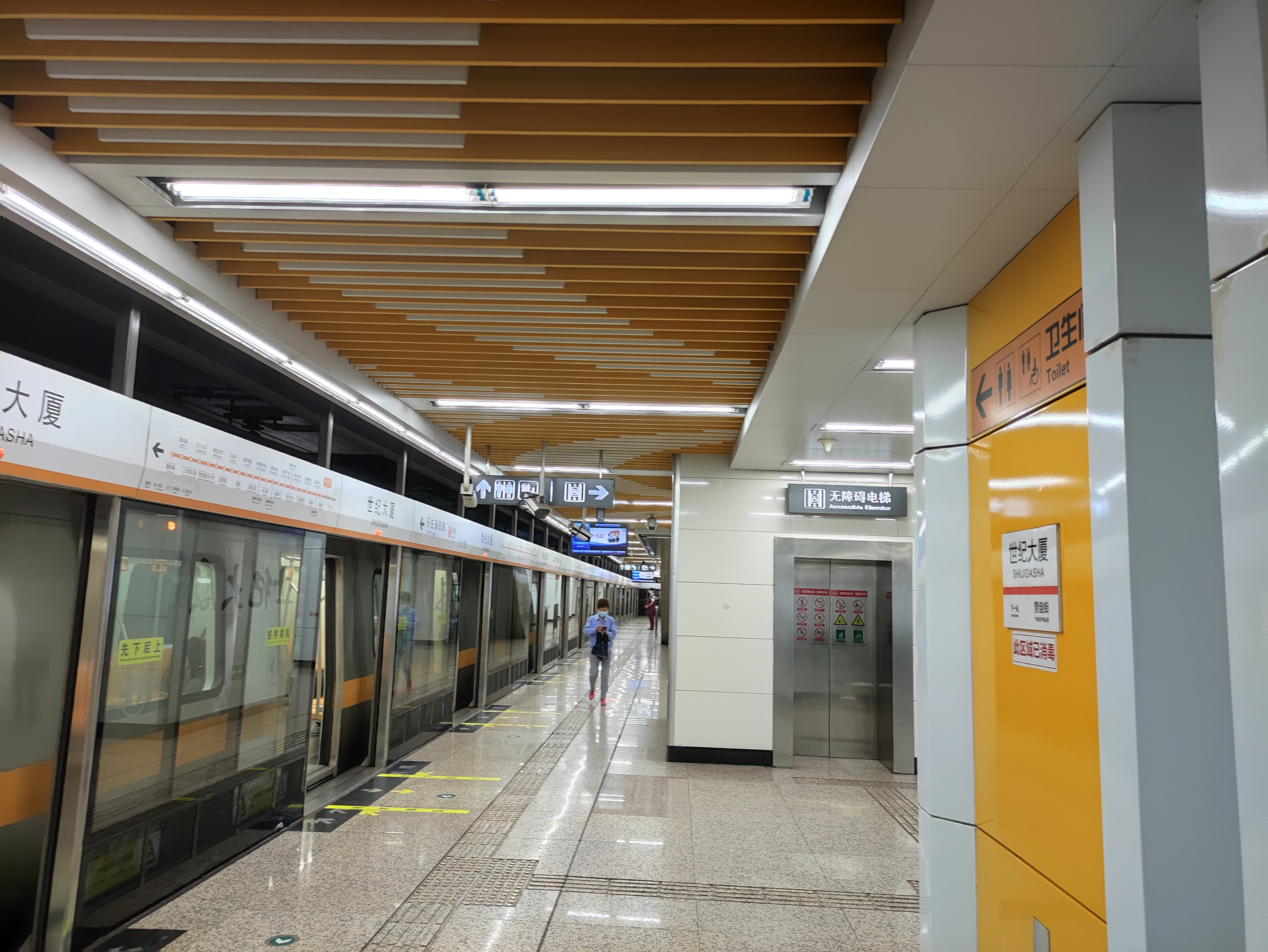
- Platform in September 2021

General information
- Location: East of Shiji Rd. Hunnan District, Shenyang, Liaoning; China
- Coordinates: 41°43′15″N 123°27′39″E
- Operator: Shenyang Metro
- Line: Line 2
- Platforms: 2

Construction
- Structure type: Underground
- Parking: Floor 8
- Accessible: Yes

Other information
- Station code: L2/03

History
- Opened: 30 December 2011; 14 years ago

Services
Preceding station	Shenyang Metro	Following station
Yingpanjie towards Putianlu	Line 2	Baitahelu towards Taoxianjichang
Location

Shijidasha (Chinese: 世纪大厦站; pinyin: Shìjìdàshà Zhàn) is a station on Line 2 of the Shenyang Metro. The station opened on 30 December 2011.

== Station Layout ==
G	Entrances and Exits	Exits B-C
B1	Concourse	Faregates, Station Agent
B2	Northbound	← Line 2 towards Putianlu (Yingpanjie)
B2	Island platform, doors open on the left
B2	Southbound	Line 2 towards Taoxianjichang (Baitahelu) →
