= Puhelu station =

Shenyang Metro station

Puhelu 蒲河路 metro
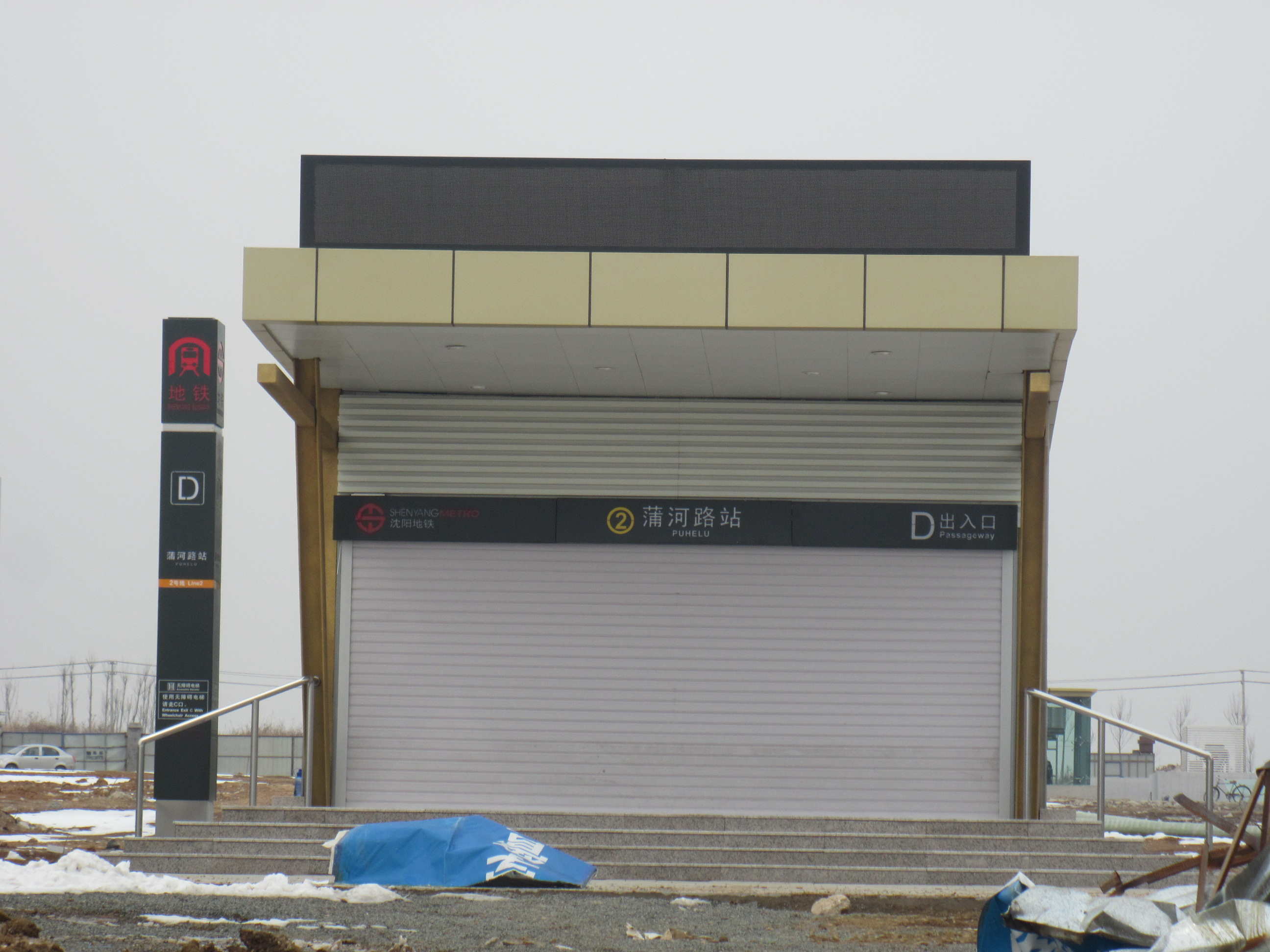
- Exit D

General information
- Location: Intersection of Puhe Rd. and Wuhua St. Shenbei New Area, Shenyang, Liaoning; China
- Coordinates: 41°57′22″N 123°24′13″E
- Operator: Shenyang Metro
- Line: Line 2
- Platforms: 2

Construction
- Structure type: Underground
- Accessible: Yes

Other information
- Station code: L2/25

History
- Opened: 8 April 2018; 8 years ago

Services
Preceding station	Shenyang Metro	Following station
Putianlu Terminus	Line 2	Renjiehugongyuan towards Taoxianjichang
Location

Puhelu (Chinese: 蒲河路站; pinyin: Púhélù Zhàn) is a station on Line 2 of the Shenyang Metro. The station opened on 8 April 2018.

== Station Layout ==
G	Entrances and Exits	Exits A-D
B1	Concourse	Faregates, Station Agent
B2	Northbound	← Line 2 towards Putianlu (Terminus)
B2	Island platform, doors open on the left
B2	Southbound	Line 2 towards Taoxianjichang (Renjiehugongyuan) →
