= Line 2 (Shenyang Metro) =

Metro line in Shenyang, China

- Line 2 train

Overview
- Status: Operational
- Owner: Shenyang
- Locale: Shenyang, Liaoning, China
- Termini: Putianlu; Taoxianjichang
- Stations: 33

Service
- Type: Rapid transit
- System: Shenyang Metro
- Services: 1
- Operator: Shenyang Metro Corporation

History
- Opened: 9 January 2012; 14 years ago

Technical
- Line length: 45.58 km (28.32 mi)
- Number of tracks: 2
- Character: Underground
- Track gauge: 1,435 mm (4 ft 8 1/2 in)

Line 2 of the Shenyang Metro (Chinese: 沈阳地铁二号线; pinyin: Shěnyáng Dìtiě Èr Hào Xiàn) is a rapid transit line running from north to south Shenyang. It was opened on January 9, 2012 and is currently 45.58 km long with 33 stations.

== Opening timeline ==
Segment	Commencement	Length	Station(s)	Name
Santaizi — Quanyunlu	9 January 2012	21.76 km (13.52 mi)	19	Phase 1
Hangkonghangtiandaxue — Santaizi	30 December 2013	5.6 km (3.48 mi)	3	Northern extension (1st section)
Putianlu — Hangkonghangtiandaxue	8 April 2018	5.1 km (3.17 mi)	4	Northern extension (2nd section)
Quanyunlu — Taoxianjichang	29 September 2023	13.7 km (8.51 mi)	7	Phase 2

== Stations (north to south) ==
station name		Transfer	Distance km		Location
Pinyin	Chinese	Transfer	Distance km		Location
Putianlu	蒲田路		0.00	0.00	Shenbei
Puhelu	蒲河路		1.12	1.12	Shenbei
Renjiehugongyuan	人杰湖公园		1.55	2.67	Shenbei
Liaoningdaxue	辽宁大学		1.01	3.68	Shenbei
Hangkonghangtiandaxue	航空航天大学		1.43	5.11	Shenbei
Shifandaxue	师范大学		1.30	6.41	Yuhong
Yixueyuan	医学院		2.40	8.81	Huanggu
Santaizi	三台子		2.00	10.81	Huanggu
Lingxi	陵西		1.45	12.26	Huanggu
Xinleyizhi	新乐遗址		0.85	13.11	Huanggu
Beilinggongyuan	北陵公园		1.25	14.36	Huanggu
Zhongyiyaodaxue	中医药大学	10	0.95	15.31	Huanggu
Qishanlu	岐山路		1.25	16.56	Huanggu
Shenyangbeizhan	沈阳北站	4 SBT	0.85	17.41	Shenhe
Jinrongzhongxin	金融中心		0.80	18.21	Shenhe
Renminguangchang	人民广场 (Note: Was Shifuguangchang until 26 December 2024)		0.90	19.11	Shenhe
Qingniandajie	青年大街	1	1.35	20.46	Shenhe
Qingniangongyuan	青年公园		0.90	21.36	Shenhe
Gongyezhanlanguan	工业展览馆	3	1.25	22.61	Heping
Shitushuguan	市图书馆		1.45	24.06	Shenhe
Wulihe	五里河		0.95	25.01	Shenhe
Aotizhongxin	奥体中心	9 Tram Line 1/5	1.60	26.61	Hunnan
Yingpanjie	营盘街	Tram Line 1	1.30	27.91	Hunnan
Shijidasha	世纪大厦	Tram Line 1/3	1.35	29.26	Hunnan
Baitahelu	白塔河路	Tram Line 1/3	1.45	30.71	Hunnan
Quanyunlu	全运路		0.90	31.61	Hunnan
Shenbendajie	沈本大街	Tram Line 1			Hunnan
Shenzhongdajie	沈中大街	Tram Line 1/3			Hunnan
Shengbowuguan	省博物馆	Tram Line 1/3			Hunnan
Zhongyanggongyuan	中央公园	Tram Line 3			Hunnan
Chuangxinyilu	创新一路	Tram Line 3			Hunnan
Zonghebaoshuiqu	综合保税区				Hunnan
Taoxianjichang	桃仙机场	SHE			Hunnan
