= Qingniangongyuan station =

Shenyang Metro station

Qingniangongyuan 青年公园 metro
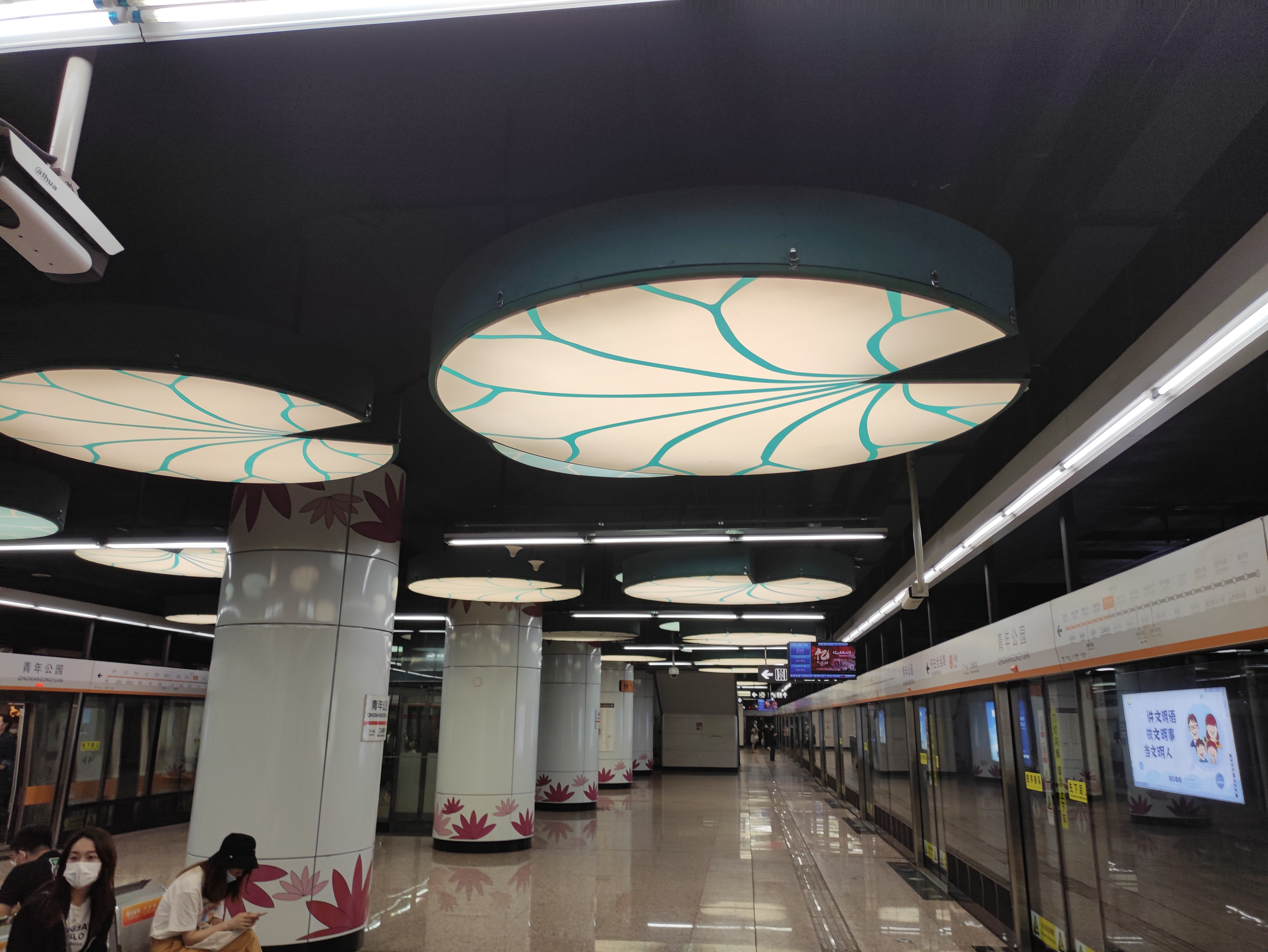
- Platform in August 2021

General information
- Location: Intersection of Xibinhe Rd. and Qingnianda St. Shenhe District, Shenyang, Liaoning; China
- Coordinates: 41°47′04″N 123°26′10″E
- Operator: Shenyang Metro
- Line: Line 2
- Platforms: 2

Construction
- Structure type: Underground
- Accessible: Yes

Other information
- Station code: L2/09

History
- Opened: 30 December 2011; 14 years ago

Services
Preceding station	Shenyang Metro	Following station
Qingniandajie towards Putianlu	Line 2	Gongyezhanlanguan towards Taoxianjichang
Location

Qingniangongyuan (Chinese: 青年公园站; pinyin: Qīngniángōngyuán Zhàn) is a station on Line 2 of the Shenyang Metro in Shenyang, China. The station opened on 30 December 2011.

== Station Layout ==
G	Entrances and Exits	Exits A-C
B1	Concourse	Faregates, Station Agent
B2	Northbound	← Line 2 towards Putianlu (Qingniandajie)
B2	Island platform, doors open on the left
B2	Southbound	Line 2 towards Taoxianjichang (Gongyezhanlanguan) →
