= Shenyangbeizhan station =

Shenyang Metro station

Shenyangbeizhan 沈阳北站 metro
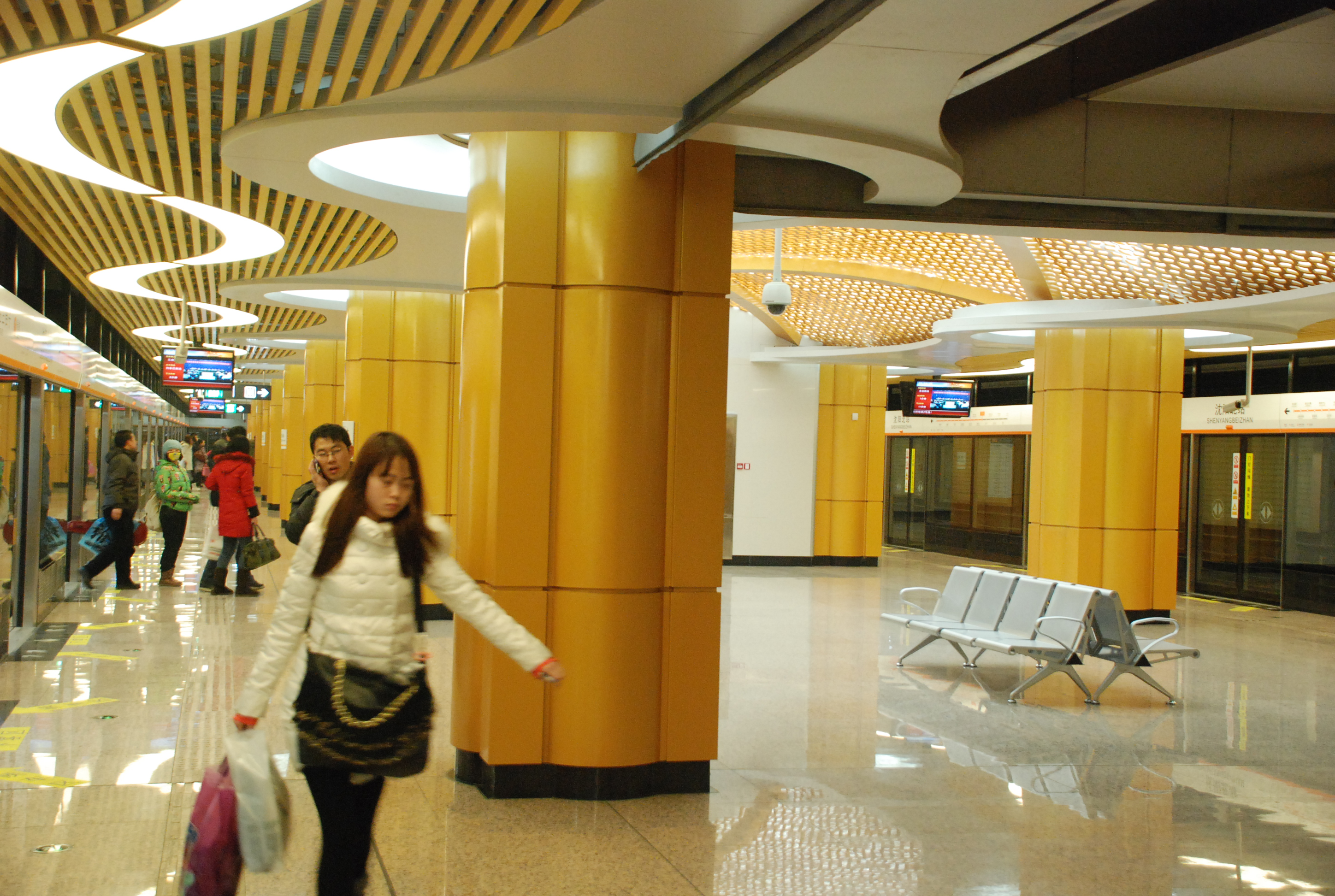
- Platform

General information
- Location: Shenyang North Railway Station; Shenhe District, Shenyang, Liaoning; China
- Coordinates: 41°49′02″N 123°26′11″E
- Operator: Shenyang Metro
- Lines: Line 2 Line 4
- Platforms: 4 (2 island platforms)

Construction
- Structure type: Underground
- Parking: Floor 7
- Accessible: Yes

Other information
- Station code: L2/13

History
- Opened: 30 December 2011; 14 years ago

Services
| Preceding station | Shenyang Metro | Following station |
|---|---|---|
| Qishanlu towards Putianlu | Line 2 | Jinrongzhongxin towards Taoxianjichang |
| Shenyangdaxue towards Zhengxinlu | Line 4 | Huangsilu towards Chuangxinlu |
Location

Shenyangbeizhan (Chinese: 沈阳北站站; pinyin: Shěnyángběizhàn Zhàn) is a station on Line 2 and Line 4 of the Shenyang Metro. It is adjacent to Shenyang North railway station. The station opened on 30 December 2011.

== Station Layout ==
| G | Entrances and Exits | Exits A-F, H, L |
| B1 | Transfer channel |
| B2 | Concourse | Faregates, Station Agent |
| B3 | Northbound | ← Line 2 towards Putianlu (Qishanlu) |
| B3 | Island platform, doors open on the left |
| B3 | Southbound | Line 2 towards Taoxianjichang (Jinrongzhongxin) → |
| B3 | Northbound | ← Line 4 towards Zhengxinlu (Shenyangdaxue) |
| B3 | Island platform, doors open on the left |
| B3 | Southbound | Line 4 towards Chuangxinlu (Huangsilu) → |
