= Wulihe station =

Shenyang Metro station

Wulihe 五里河 metro
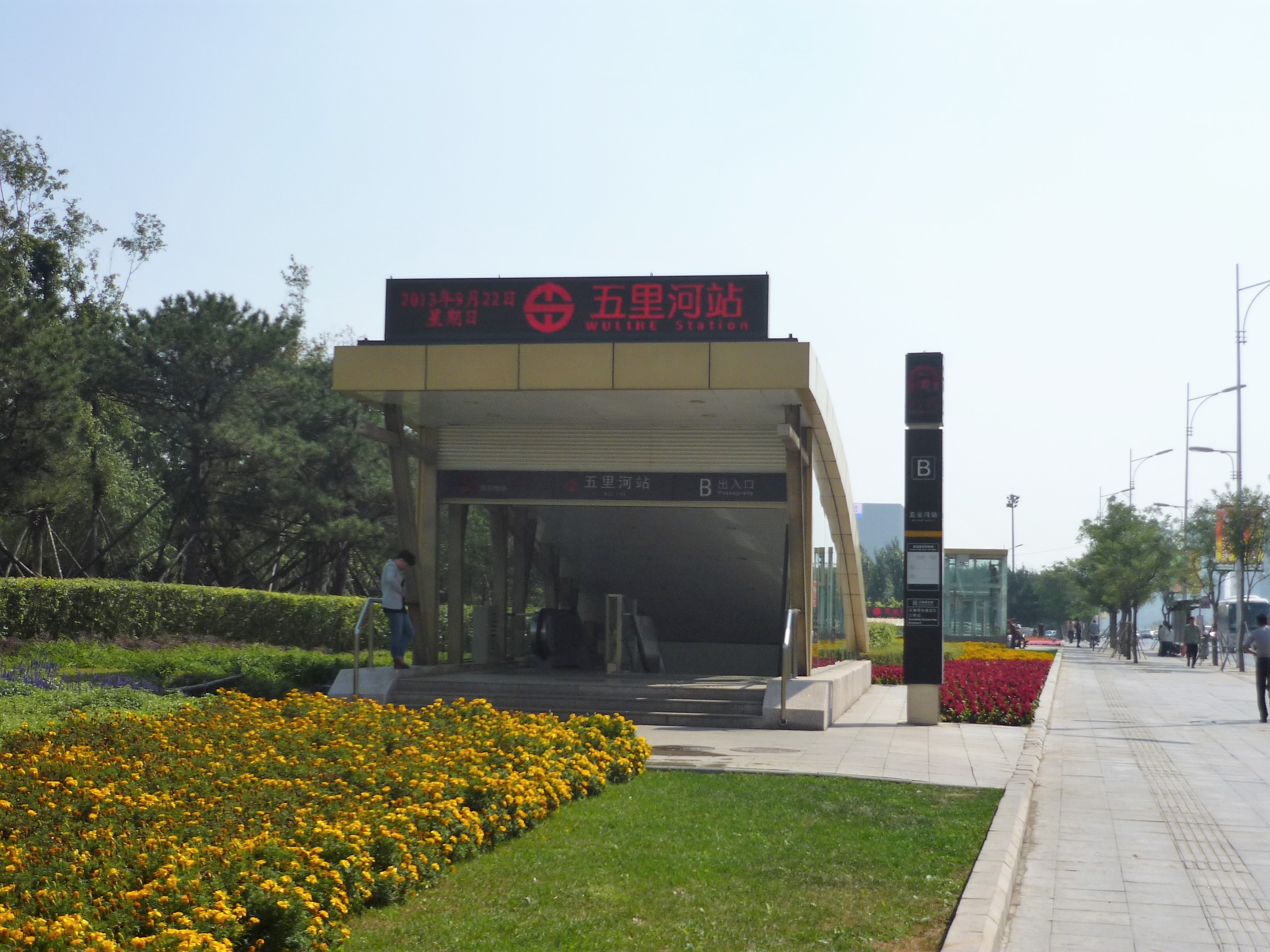
- Exit B

General information
- Location: East of Qingnian St. Shenhe District, Shenyang, Liaoning; China
- Coordinates: 41°45′08″N 123°26′28″E
- Operator: Shenyang Metro
- Line: Line 2
- Platforms: 2

Construction
- Structure type: Underground
- Accessible: Yes

Other information
- Station code: L2/06

History
- Opened: 30 December 2011; 14 years ago

Services
Preceding station	Shenyang Metro	Following station
Shitushuguan towards Putianlu	Line 2	Aotizhongxin towards Taoxianjichang
Location

Wulihe (Chinese: 五里河站; pinyin: Wǔlǐhé Zhàn) is a station on Line 2 of the Shenyang Metro. The station opened on 30 December 2011.

== Station Layout ==
G	Entrances and Exits	Exits B-D
B1	Concourse	Faregates, Station Agent
B2	Northbound	← Line 2 towards Putianlu (Shitushuguan)
B2	Island platform, doors open on the left
B2	Southbound	Line 2 towards Taoxianjichang (Aotizhongxin) →
