= Fiyanggū =

Fiyanggū is a Manchu gender-neutral but most commonly used as a masculine given name meaning "the youngest child". It may refer to:

- Fiyanggū (Donggo)，Qing's grand general of early Kangxi era and younger brother of Consort Donggo
- Fiyanggū (Imperial clansman), Prince Dodo's son, the Imperial duke, but later deprived
- Fiyanggū (Irgen Gioro), Minister of Imperial Guard and Second Class Baron
- Fiyanggū (Ula Nara), Empress Xiaojingxian's father
- Fiyanggū, Prince Jian, Šurhaci's son, posthumously titled Prince Jian
