= Huanggu, Shenyang =

Huanggu 皇姑区
- District
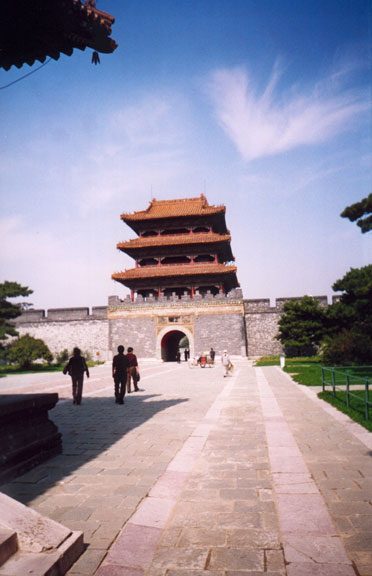
- Zhao Mausoleum

- Location in Liaoning
- Coordinates: 41°51′17″N 123°25′10″E
- Country: People's Republic of China
- Province: Liaoning
- Sub-provincial city: Shenyang

Area
  - Total: 66 km^{2} (25 sq mi)

Population (2020)
  - Total: 877,287
  - Density: 13,000/km^{2} (34,000/sq mi)
- Time zone: UTC+8 (China Standard)
- Postal code: 110031~110036

Huanggu District (Chinese: 皇姑区; pinyin: Huánggū Qū) is one of ten districts of the prefecture-level city of Shenyang, the capital of the Chinese province of Liaoning. It borders Shenbei New Area to the north, Dadong to the east, Shenhe to the southeast, Heping to the south, Tiexi to the southwest, and Yuhong to the west.

== Toponymy ==
The district is named after Huanggutun ("tun" means village), where the Huanggutun Incident of 1928 took place. Although the Chinese characters used to write the name of the district mean "royal aunt", the name is actually a transliteration of Fiyanggū (Manchu: ᡶᡳᠶᠠᠩᡤᡡ, Chinese: 費揚武, 1605–1643), the Manchu Prince Jian of the First Rank whose tomb was in the area.

Huanggu, Shenyang
- Simplified Chinese: 皇姑区
- Traditional Chinese: 皇姑區
- Literal meaning: Royal aunt
Transcriptions
Standard Mandarin
- Hanyu Pinyin: Huánggū Qū

== Politics ==
Huanggu District hosts the seat of the Provincial Government of Liaoning.

== Administrative divisions ==
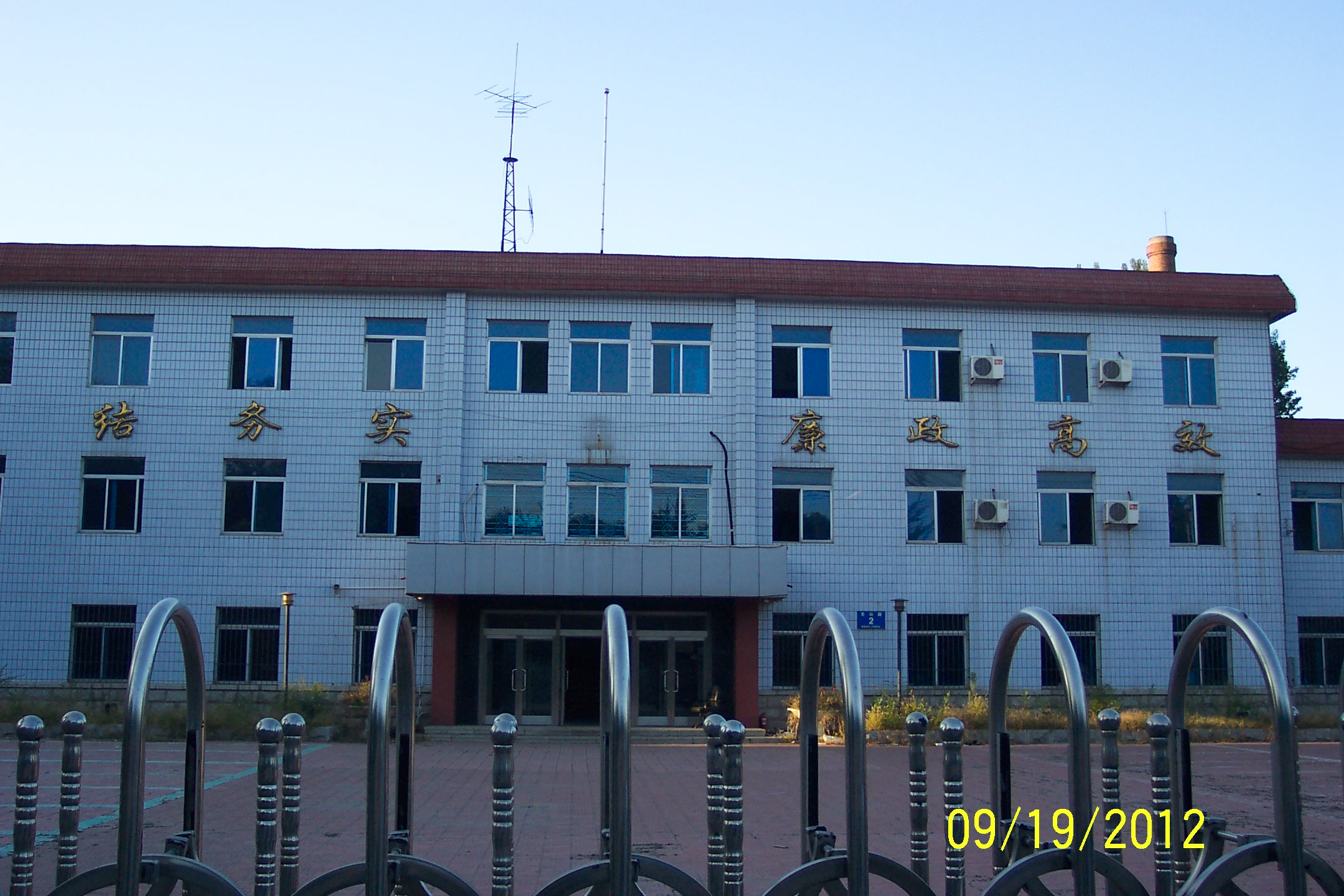
Huanggu District Government Headquarters as of 2012

Huanggu has twelve subdistricts:

- Liaohe Subdistrict (辽河街道)
- Shouquan Subdistrict (寿泉街道)
- Santaizi Subdistrict (三台子街道)
- Minglian Subdistrict (明廉街道)
- Tawan Subdistrict (塔湾街道)
- Huanghe Subdistrict (黄河街道)
- Lingbei Subdistrict (陵北街道)
- Huashan Subdistrict (华山街道)
- Xinle Subdistrict (新乐街道)
- Sandongqiao Subdistrict (三洞桥街道)
- Shelita Subdistrict (舍利塔街道)
- Beita Subdistrict (北塔街道)
- Lingdong Subdistrict (陵东街道)

== Education ==
The main campus of the Liaoning University of Traditional Chinese Medicine (LNUTCM) is in this district.

== Visitor attractions ==
The district is the site of Beiling park, the large historical mausoleum of Qing dynasty emperor Huang Taiji, as well as the Liaoning Mansion Hotel.
