= Shenbei New Area =

Shenbei 沈北新区
- District
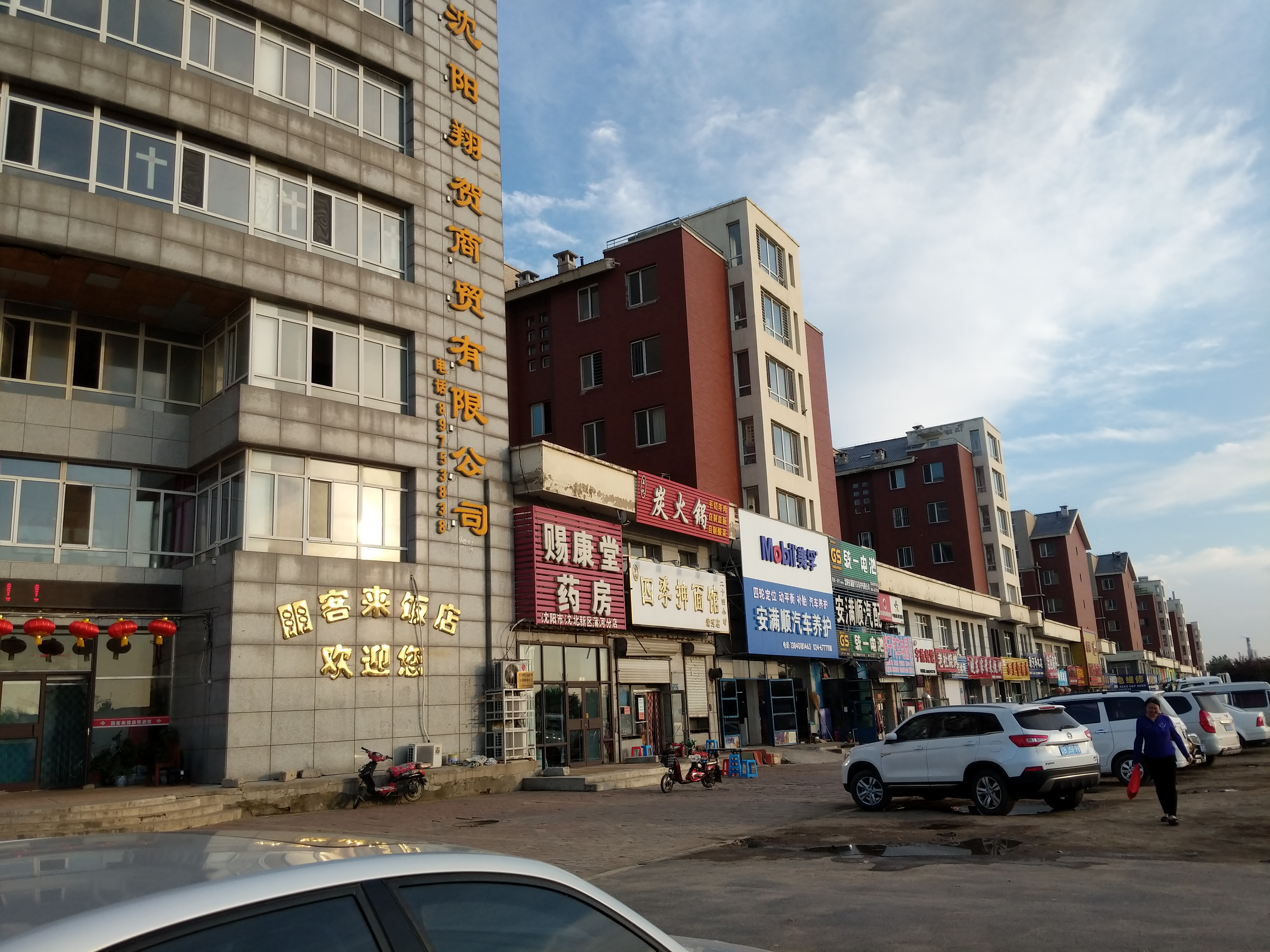

- Location in Liaoning
- Coordinates: 42°02′49″N 123°31′50″E
- Country: People's Republic of China
- Province: Liaoning
- Sub-provincial city: Shenyang

Area
  - Total: 878 km^{2} (339 sq mi)

Population (2020)
  - Total: 619,375
  - Density: 705/km^{2} (1,830/sq mi)
- Time zone: UTC+8 (China Standard)

Shenbei New Area (simplified Chinese: 沈北新区; traditional Chinese: 沈北新區; pinyin: Shěnběi Xīn Qū) is a development zone and one of ten districts of the prefecture-level city of Shenyang, the capital of Liaoning Province, Northeast China, and forms part of the northern suburbs. It borders Dongling District to the southeast, Dadong District and Huanggu District to the south, Yuhong District to the southwest, Xinmin City and Faku County to the northwest; it also borders the prefecture-level cities of Tieling to the northeast and Fushun to the southeast.

== Climate ==
Climate data for Xinchengzi, Shenbei New Area, elevation 62 m (203 ft), (1991–2020 normals)
Month	Jan	Feb	Mar	Apr	May	Jun	Jul	Aug	Sep	Oct	Nov	Dec	Year
Mean daily maximum °C (°F)	−5.3 (22.5)	−0.2 (31.6)	7.4 (45.3)	16.9 (62.4)	24.0 (75.2)	27.6 (81.7)	29.3 (84.7)	28.5 (83.3)	24.3 (75.7)	16.1 (61.0)	5.4 (41.7)	−3.1 (26.4)	14.2 (57.6)
Daily mean °C (°F)	−12.1 (10.2)	−6.8 (19.8)	1.2 (34.2)	10.3 (50.5)	17.7 (63.9)	22.2 (72.0)	24.6 (76.3)	23.4 (74.1)	17.6 (63.7)	9.5 (49.1)	−0.3 (31.5)	−9.1 (15.6)	8.2 (46.7)
Mean daily minimum °C (°F)	−17.9 (−0.2)	−12.8 (9.0)	−4.4 (24.1)	3.9 (39.0)	11.6 (52.9)	17.1 (62.8)	20.5 (68.9)	19.2 (66.6)	12.1 (53.8)	3.9 (39.0)	−5.3 (22.5)	−14.4 (6.1)	2.8 (37.0)
Average precipitation mm (inches)	4.6 (0.18)	7.6 (0.30)	14.1 (0.56)	31.3 (1.23)	58.9 (2.32)	84.0 (3.31)	188.2 (7.41)	149.6 (5.89)	44.9 (1.77)	39.3 (1.55)	19.4 (0.76)	9.1 (0.36)	651 (25.64)
Average precipitation days (≥ 0.1 mm)	3.2	3.1	4.7	6.7	9.2	11.8	12.2	11.2	7.3	6.3	5.4	4.1	85.2
Average snowy days	4.3	3.7	3.6	1.1	0	0	0	0	0	0.5	3.7	4.9	21.8
Average relative humidity (%)	64	56	52	50	54	68	79	81	73	66	64	65	64
Mean monthly sunshine hours	176.3	187.4	224.2	222.8	248.3	223.1	195.0	204.2	223.1	202.1	159.4	156.0	2,421.9
Percentage possible sunshine	60	62	60	55	55	49	43	48	60	60	55	55	55
Source: China Meteorological Administration
