= Zhongjie =

Commercial pedestrian street in Shenyang, China

Coordinates: 41°48′04.8″N 123°27′24.8″E

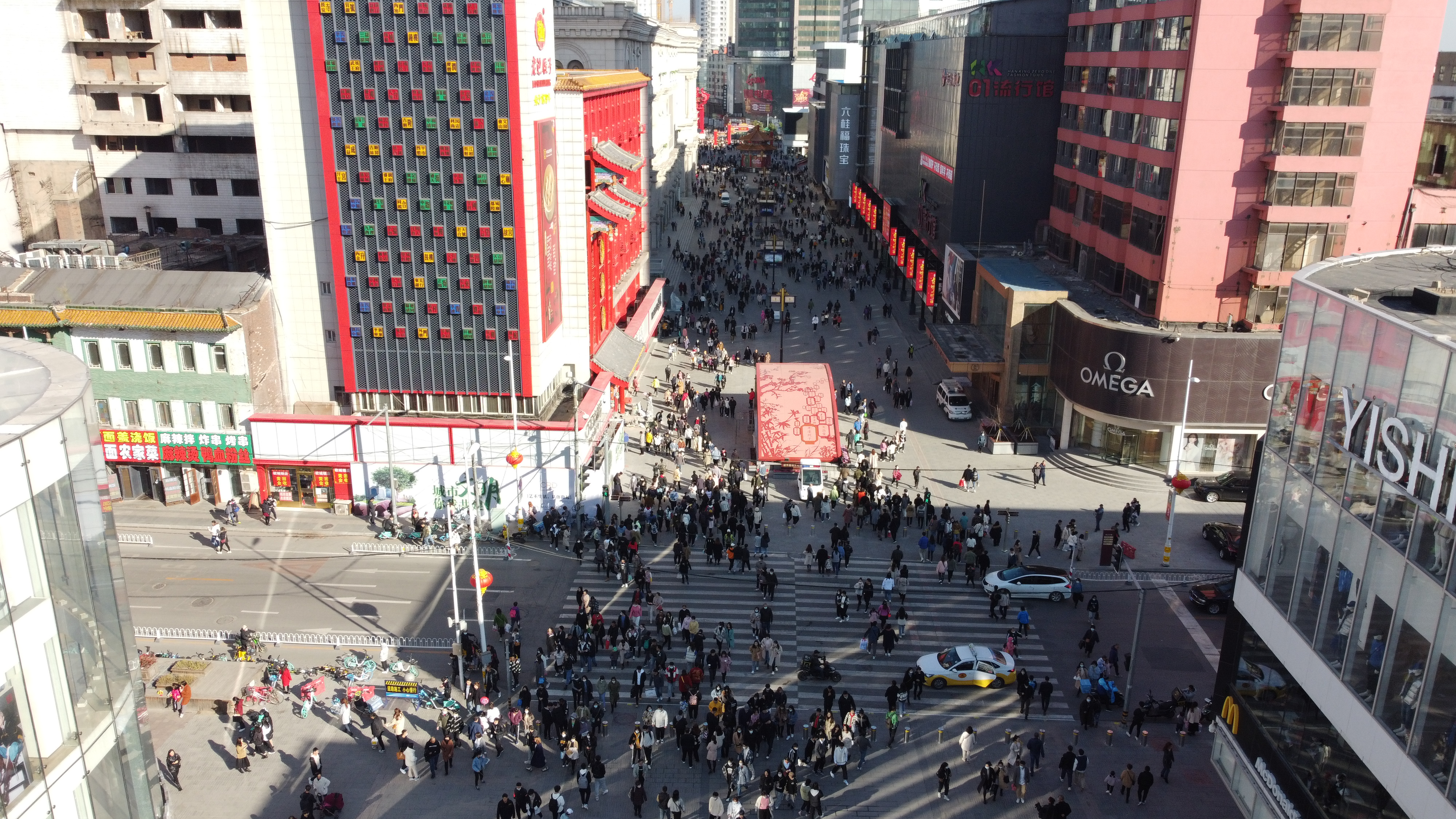
Zhongjie in October 2020

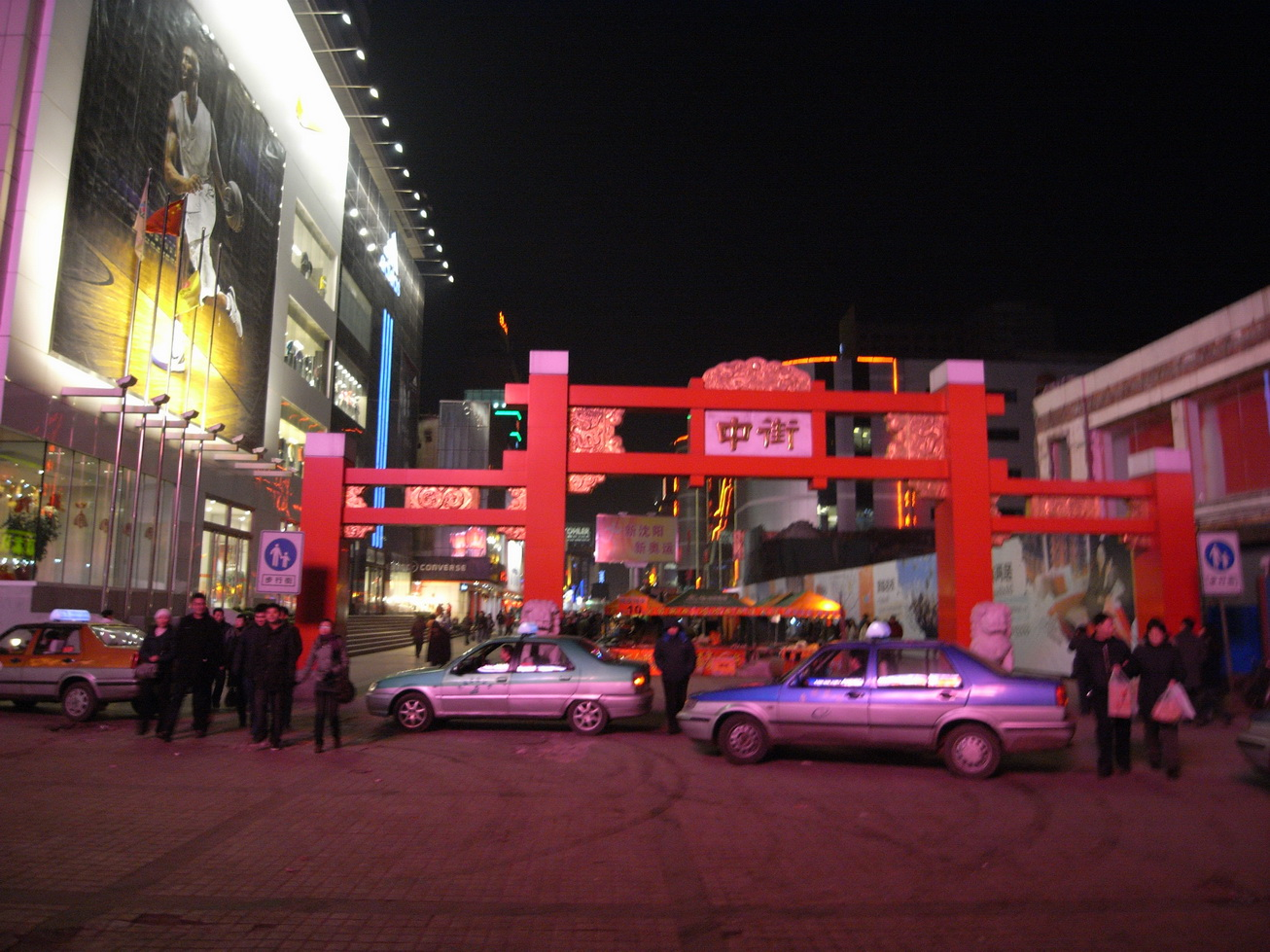
A night view of Zhongjie

Zhongjie (Chinese: 中街) or Middle Street is the traditional shopping street near the Mukden Palace in Shenyang, Liaoning Province, China. It is 1,500 meters long. Part of the street is now a pedestrian zone.

== History ==
The history of Zhongjie goes back to the latter part of the Qing Dynasty, when it was called Siping Street (Chinese: 四平路). It was the oldest shopping street in Shenyang. In the renovation project in 1997, Zhongjie became China's first pedestrian zone street.

== Transportation ==
- Zhongjie station and Dongzhongjie station on Shenyang Metro Line 1

== See also ==
- Shopping streets in Shenyang
