= Tiexi Stadium =

Sports venue in Shenyang, China

- 铁西体育场
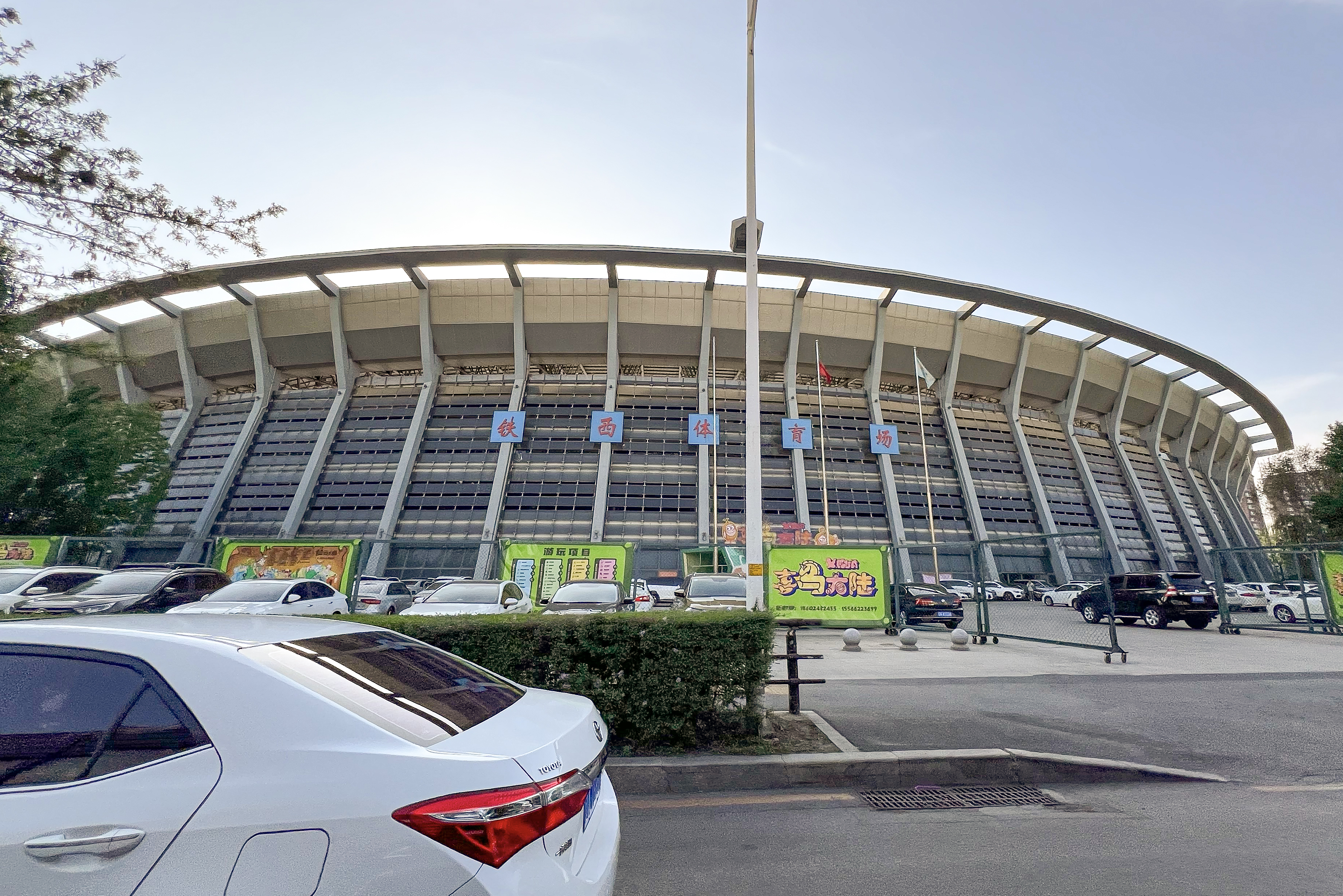
- Interactive map of Tiexi Stadium
- Location: Shenyang, Liaoning, China
- Coordinates: 41°48′32.6″N 123°19′14.0″E
- Capacity: 40,000
- Public transit: 1 at Zhonggongjie

Construction
- Expanded: 2025

Tenants
- Liaoning; Liaoning Tieren (2025–present)

Tiexi Stadium (Chinese: 铁西体育场) is a multi-purpose stadium in Tiexi District, Shenyang, China. The stadium has a capacity of 40,000 people, and the gymnasium has a capacity of 4,000 people.

On 31 May 2025, Tiexi Stadium was reopened after the removal of its athletic track.

== See also ==
- List of football stadiums in China
- List of stadiums in China
- Lists of stadiums
