= Nanshichang station =

Shenyang Metro station

Nanshichang 南市场
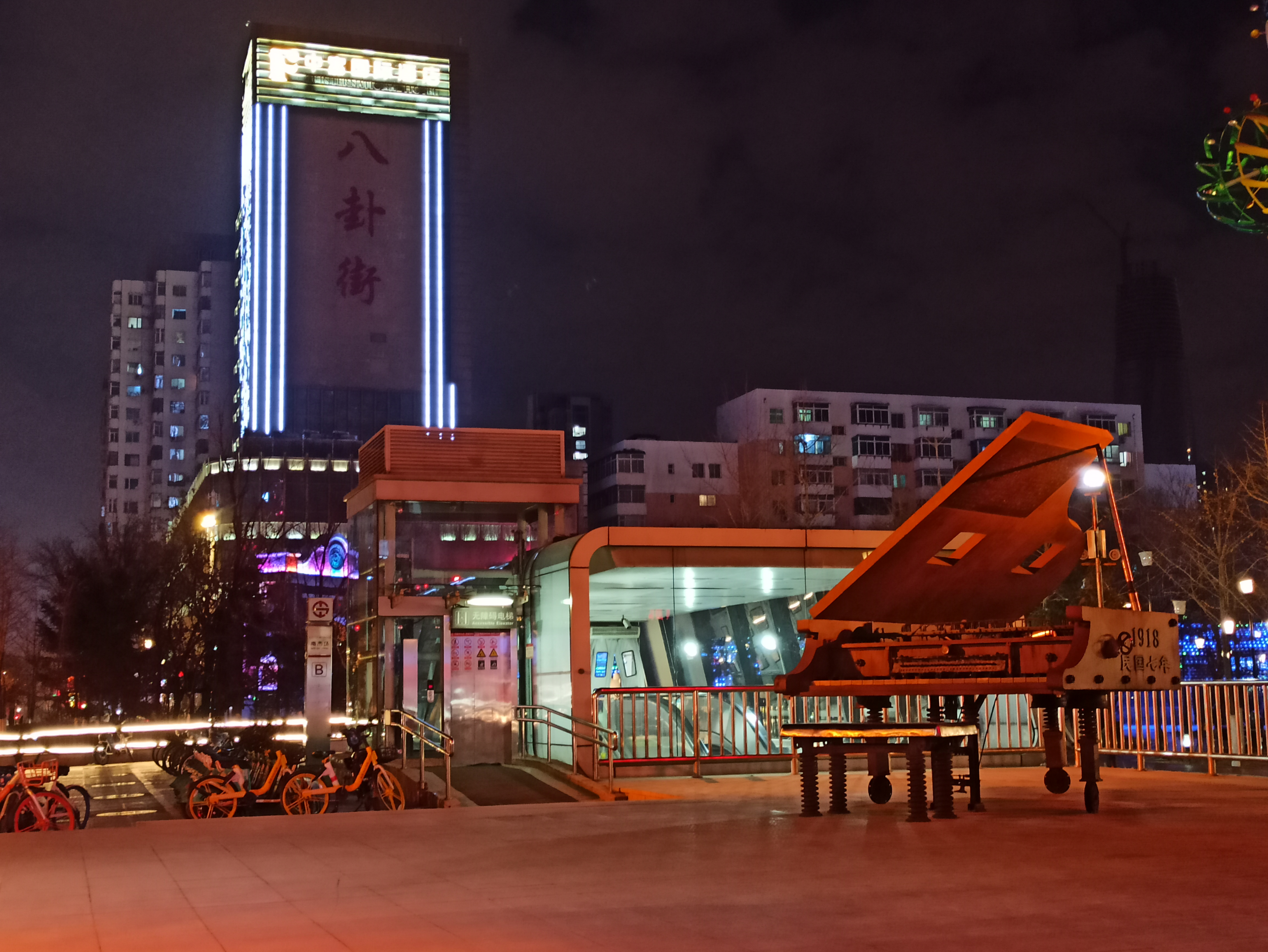

General information
- Location: Intersection of Shiyiwei Rd. and North Wujing St. Heping District, Shenyang, Liaoning; China
- Coordinates: 41°47′22″N 123°25′12″E
- Operator: Shenyang Metro
- Line: Line 1
- Platforms: 2

Construction
- Structure type: Underground
- Accessible: Yes

Other information
- Station code: L1/07

History
- Opened: 27 September 2010; 15 years ago

Services
| Preceding station | Shenyang Metro | Following station |
|---|---|---|
| Taiyuanjie towards Shisanhaojie | Line 1 | Qingniandajie towards Shuangma |
Location

Nanshichang (Chinese: 南市场站; pinyin: Nánshìchǎng Zhàn) is a station on Line 1 of the Shenyang Metro. The station opened on 27 September 2010.

== Station Layout ==
| G | Entrances and Exits | Exits A-B |
| B1 | Concourse | Faregates, Station Agent |
| B2 | Westbound | ← Line 1 towards Shisanhaojie (Taiyuanjie) |
| B2 | Island platform, doors open on the left |
| B2 | Eastbound | Line 1 towards Shuangma (Qingniandajie) → |
