= Zhangshi station =

Shenyang Metro station

Zhangshi 张士 metro
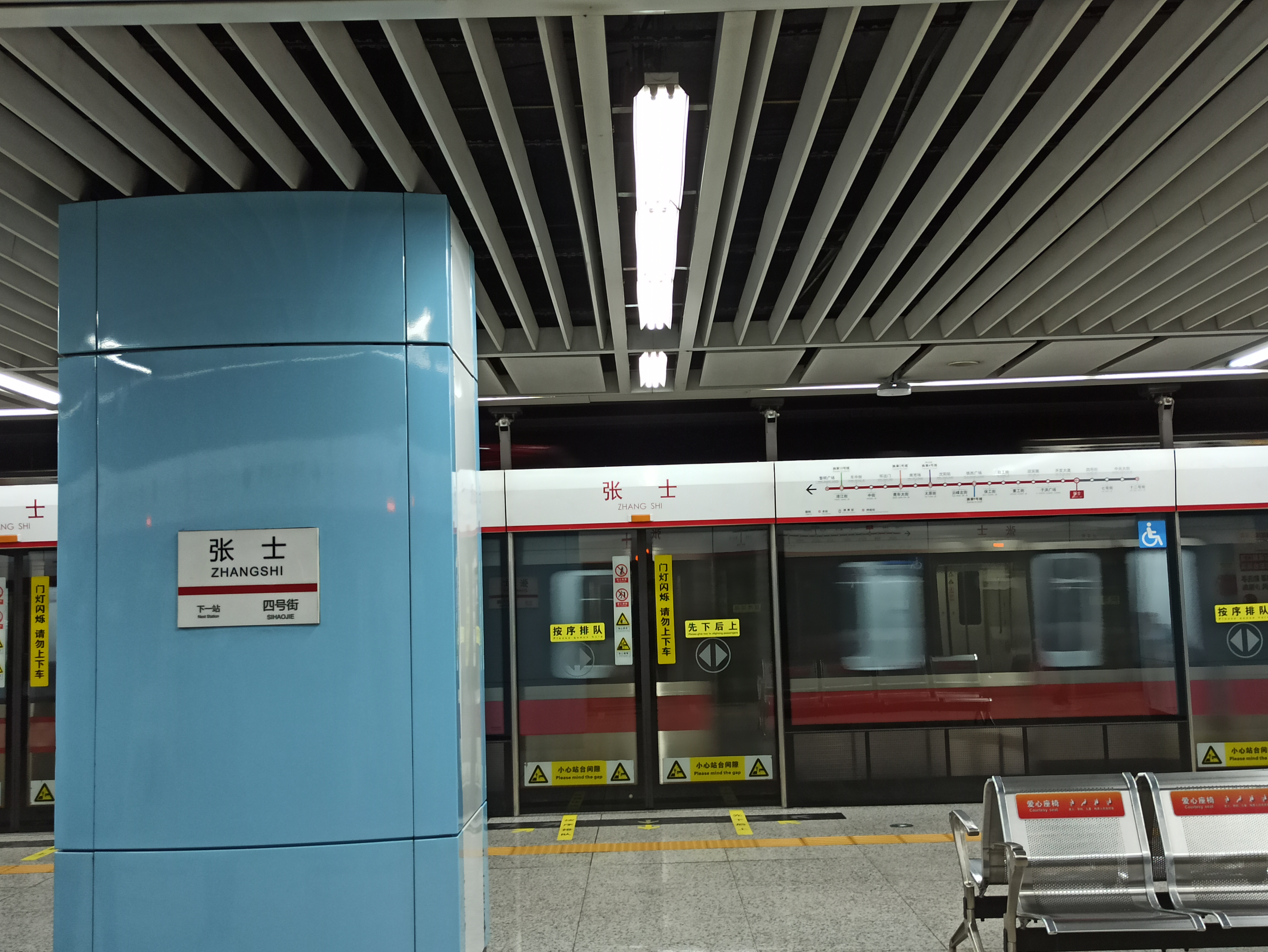

General information
- Location: Intersection of Kuminghu St. and Canghai Rd. Tiexi District, Shenyang, Liaoning; China
- Coordinates: 41°46′11.0″N 123°17′17.5″E
- Operator: Shenyang Metro
- Line: Line 1
- Platforms: 2

Construction
- Structure type: Underground
- Accessible: Yes

History
- Opened: 27 September 2010

Services
Preceding station	Shenyang Metro	Following station
Sihaojie towards Shisanhaojie	Line 1	Kaifadadao towards Shuangma
Location

Zhangshi (Chinese: 张士站; pinyin: Zhāngshì Zhàn) is a station on Line 1 of the Shenyang Metro. The station opened on 27 September 2010.

== Station Layout ==
G	Entrances and Exits	Exits A-D
B1	Concourse	Faregates, Station Agent
B2	Westbound	← Line 1 towards Shisanhaojie (Sihaojie)
B2	Island platform, doors open on the left
B2	Eastbound	Line 1 towards Shuangma (Kaifadadao) →
