= Shenyangzhan station =

Shenyang Metro station

Shenyangzhan 沈阳站 metro
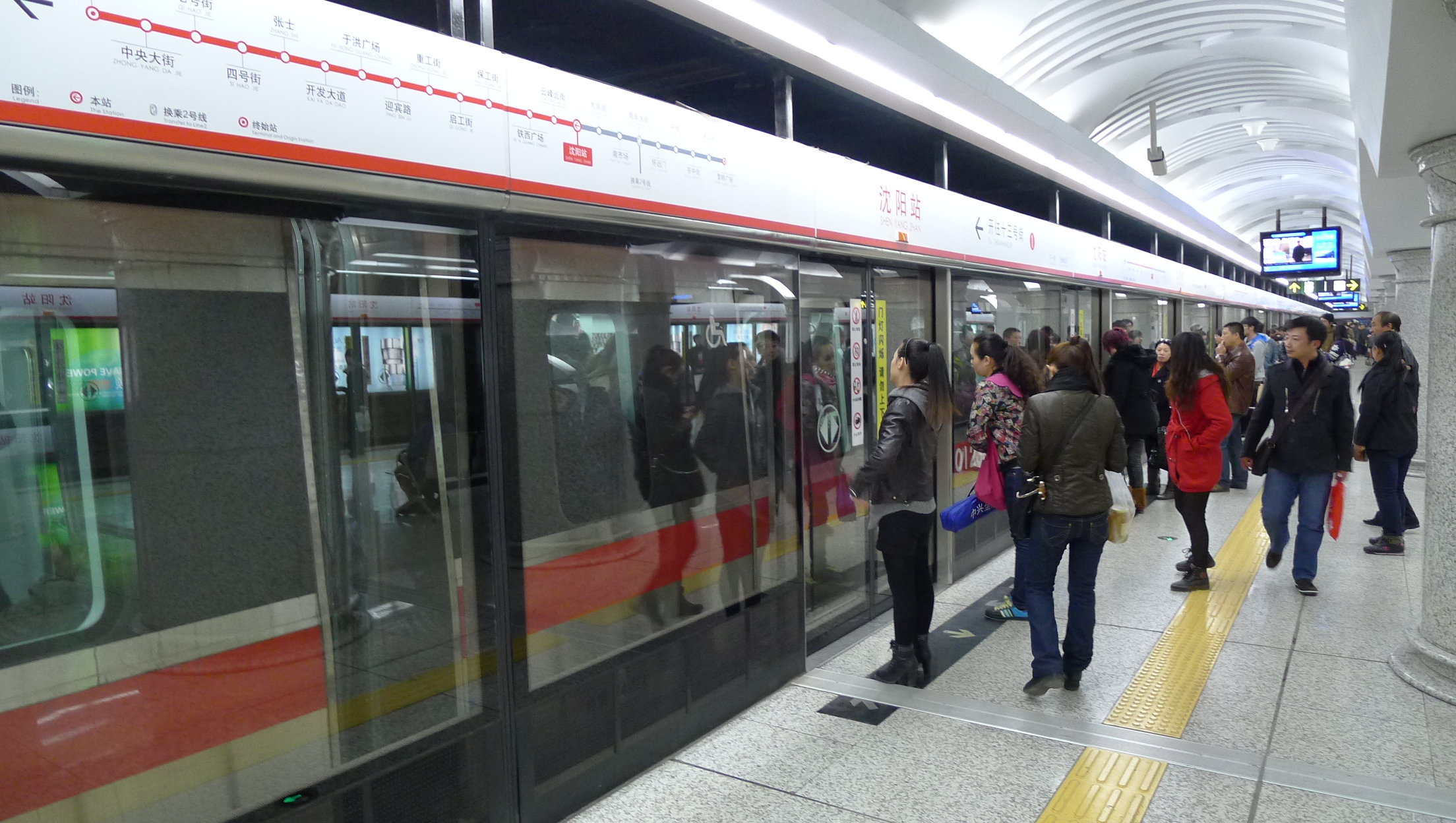
- Platform

General information
- Location: Intersection of Zhonghua Rd. and Shengji St. Heping District, Shenyang, Liaoning; China
- Coordinates: 41°47′38″N 123°23′48″E
- Operator: Shenyang Metro
- Line: Line 1
- Platforms: 2

Construction
- Structure type: Underground
- Accessible: Yes

Other information
- Station code: L1/09

History
- Opened: 27 September 2010; 15 years ago

Services
Preceding station	Shenyang Metro	Following station
Yunfengbeijie towards Shisanhaojie	Line 1	Taiyuanjie towards Shuangma
Location

Shenyangzhan (Chinese: 沈阳站站; pinyin: Shěnyángzhàn Zhàn) is a station on Line 1 of the Shenyang Metro. It is adjacent to Shenyang railway station. The station opened on 27 September 2010.

== Station Layout ==
G	Entrances and Exits	Exits A-D
B1	Concourse	Faregates, Station Agent
B2	Westbound	← Line 1 towards Shisanhaojie (Yunfengbeijie)
B2	Island platform, doors open on the left
B2	Eastbound	Line 1 towards Shuangma (Taiyuanjie) →
