= Baogongjie station =

Shenyang Metro station

Baogongjie 保工街 metro
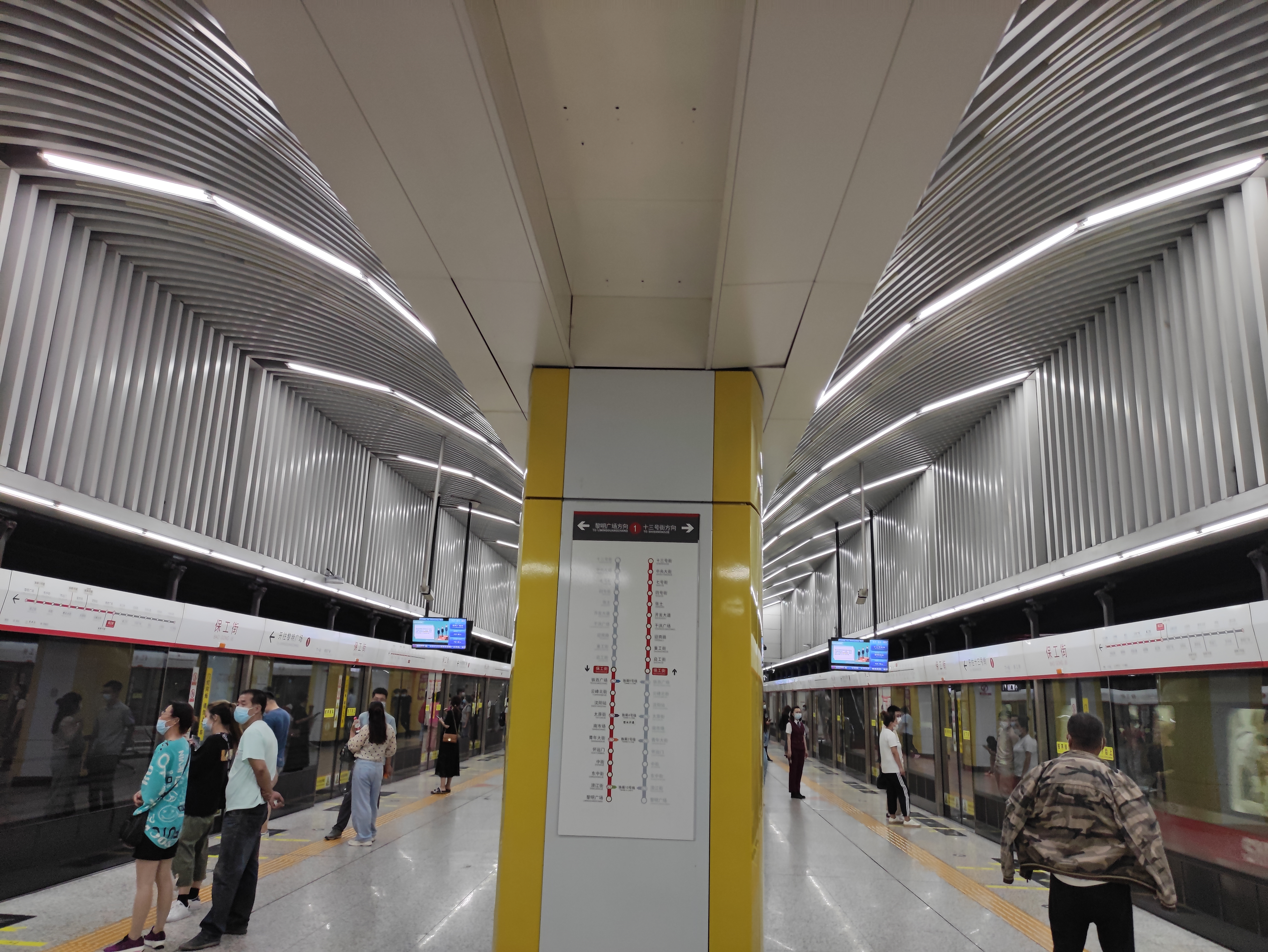
- Platform in 2021

General information
- Location: Intersection of Baogong St. and Jianshe Rd. Tiexi District, Shenyang, Liaoning; China
- Coordinates: 41°46′19″N 123°17′39″E
- Operator: Shenyang Metro
- Line: Line 1
- Platforms: 2

Construction
- Structure type: Underground
- Accessible: Yes

Other information
- Station code: L1/12

History
- Opened: 27 September 2010; 15 years ago

Services
Preceding station	Shenyang Metro	Following station
Qigongjie towards Shisanhaojie	Line 1	Tiexiguangchang towards Shuangma
Location

Baogongjie (Chinese: 保工街站; pinyin: Bǎogōngjiē Zhàn) is a station on Line 1 of the Shenyang Metro. The station opened on 27 September 2010.

== Station Layout ==
G	Entrances and Exits	Exits A-C
B1	Concourse	Faregates, Station Agent
B2	Westbound	← Line 1 towards Shisanhaojie (Qigongjie)
B2	Island platform, doors open on the left
B2	Eastbound	Line 1 towards Shuangma (Tiexiguangchang) →
