= Qingniandajie station =

Shenyang Metro interchange station

Qingniandajie 青年大街 metro
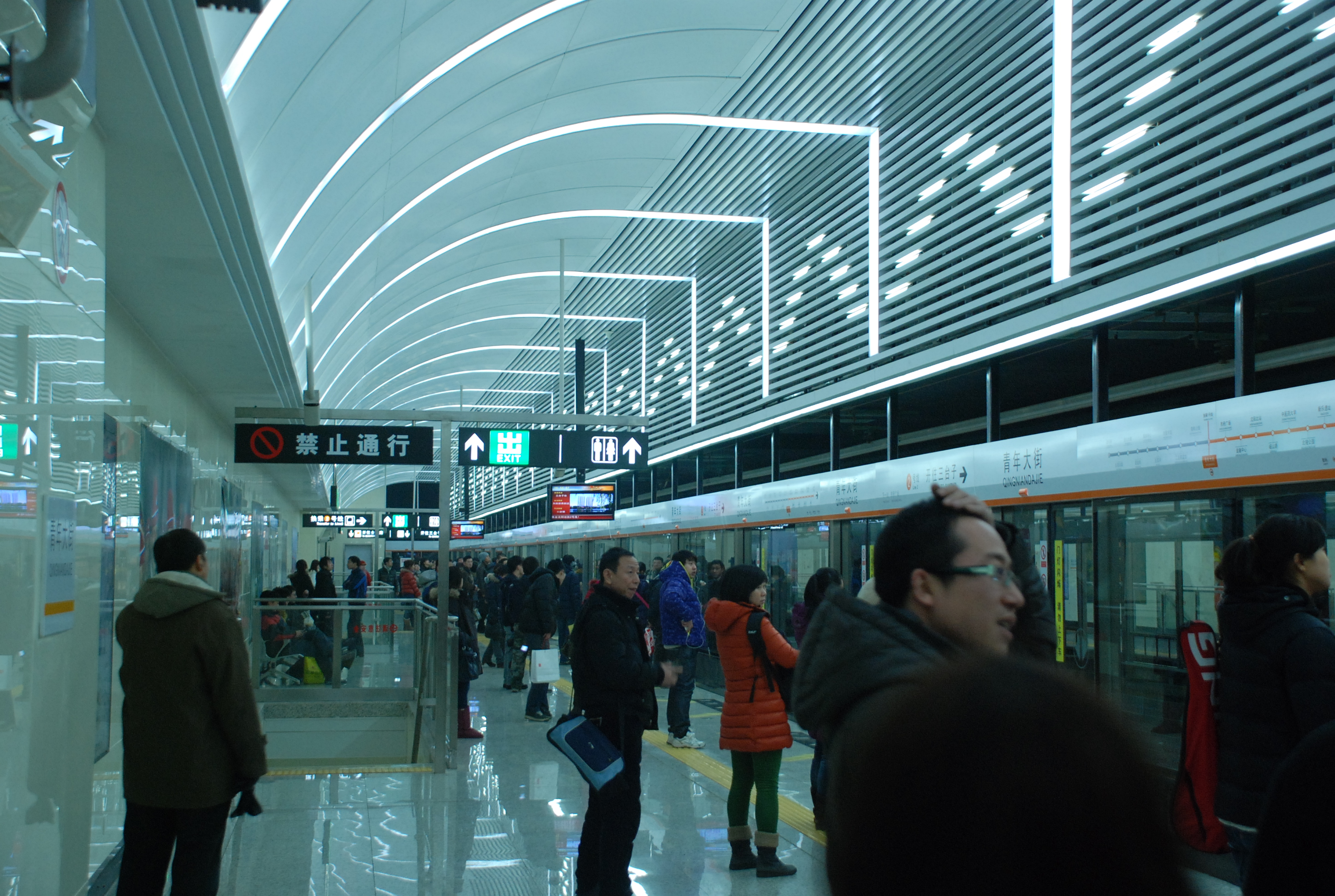
- Line 2 northbound platform

General information
- Location: Intersection of Daxi Rd. and Qingnian St. Shenhe District, Shenyang, Liaoning; China
- Coordinates: 41°47′32″N 123°26′00″E
- Operator: Shenyang Metro
- Lines: Line 1 Line 2
- Platforms: 4 (1 island platform, 2 side platforms)

Construction
- Structure type: Underground
- Accessible: Yes

Other information
- Station code: L1/06 (Line 1); L2/10 (Line 2)

History
- Opened: 27 September 2010; 15 years ago (Line 1); 30 December 2011; 14 years ago (Line 2)

Services
Preceding station	Shenyang Metro	Following station
Nanshichang towards Shisanhaojie	Line 1	Huaiyuanmen towards Shuangma
Renminguangchang towards Putianlu	Line 2	Qingniangongyuan towards Taoxianjichang
Location

Qingniandajie (Chinese: 青年大街站; pinyin: Qīngniándàjiē Zhàn) is an interchange station on lines 1 and 2 of the Shenyang Metro. The line 1 station opened on 27 September 2010, and the line 2 station opened on 30 December 2011.

== Station Layout ==
G	Entrances and Exits	Exits A-D
B1	Concourse	Faregates, Station Agent
B1	Side platform, doors open on the right
B1	Northbound	← Line 2 towards Putianlu (Renminguangchang)
B1	Southbound	Line 2 towards Taoxianjichang (Qingniangongyuan) →
B1	Side platform, doors open on the right
B1	Concourse	Faregates, Station Agent
B2	Interchange corridor
B3	Westbound	← Line 1 towards Shisanhaojie (Nanshichang)
B3	Island platform, doors open on the left
B3	Eastbound	Line 1 towards Shuangma (Huaiyuanmen) →
