= Huaiyuanmen station =

Shenyang Metro station

Huaiyuanmen 怀远门 metro
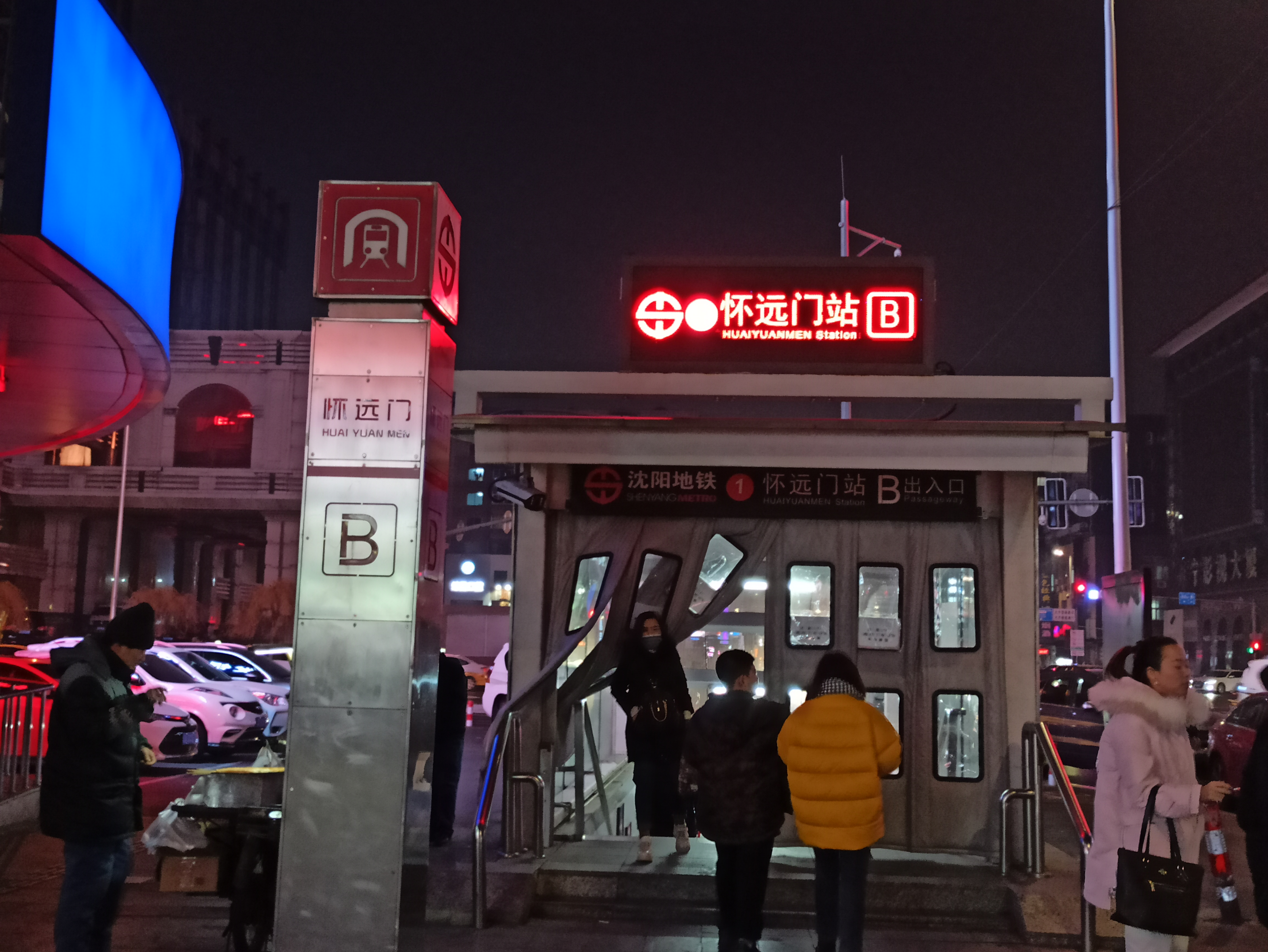

General information
- Location: Intersection of Daxi Rd. and Xishuncheng St. Shenhe District, Shenyang, Liaoning; China
- Coordinates: 41°47′49″N 123°26′51″E
- Operator: Shenyang Metro
- Line: Line 1
- Platforms: 2

Construction
- Structure type: Underground
- Parking: Floor 7
- Accessible: Yes

Other information
- Station code: L1/05

History
- Opened: 27 September 2010; 15 years ago

Services
Preceding station	Shenyang Metro	Following station
Qingniandajie towards Shisanhaojie	Line 1	Zhongjie towards Shuangma
Location

Huaiyuanmen (Chinese: 怀远门站; pinyin: Huáiyuǎnmén Zhàn) is a station on Line 1 of the Shenyang Metro. The station opened on 27 September 2010.

== Station Layout ==
G	Entrances and Exits	Exits A-C
B1	Concourse	Faregates, Station Agent
B2	Westbound	← Line 1 towards Shisanhaojie (Qingniandajie)
B2	Island platform, doors open on the left
B2	Eastbound	Line 1 towards Shuangma (Zhongjie) →
