= Taiyuanjie station =

Shenyang Metro station

Taiyuanjie 太原街 metro
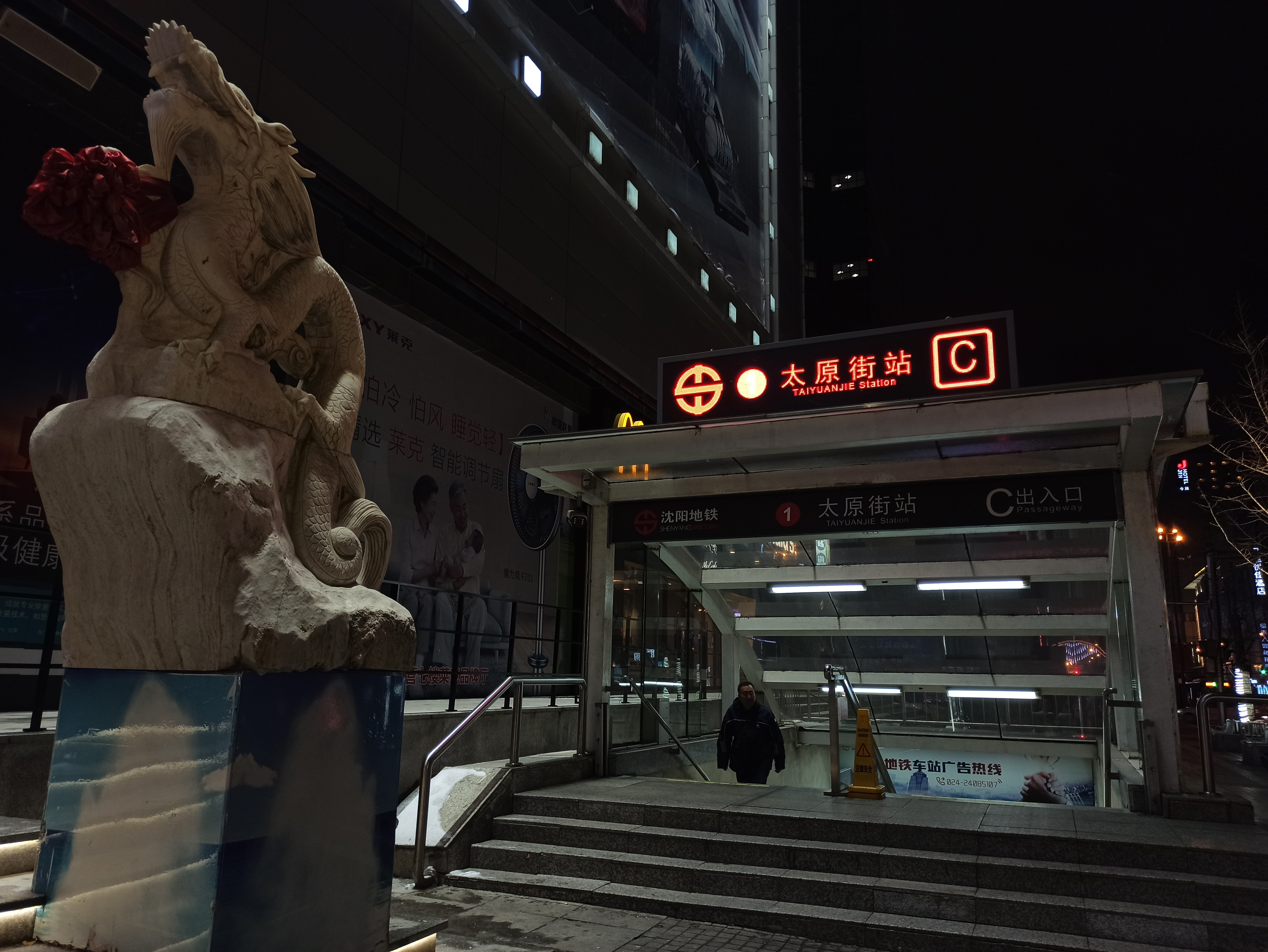

General information
- Location: Intersection of Nanjing St. and Zhonghua Rd. Heping District, Shenyang, Liaoning; China
- Coordinates: 41°47′23″N 123°24′22″E
- Operator: Shenyang Metro
- Lines: Line 1 Line 4
- Platforms: 4 (2 island platforms)

Construction
- Structure type: Underground
- Accessible: Yes

Other information
- Station code: L1/08

History
- Opened: 27 September 2010; 15 years ago

Services
Preceding station	Shenyang Metro	Following station
Shenyangzhan towards Shisanhaojie	Line 1	Nanshichang towards Shuangma
Shifudalu towards Zhengxinlu	Line 4	Nanwumalu towards Chuangxinlu
Location

Taiyuanjie (Chinese: 太原街站; pinyin: Tàiyuánjiē Zhàn) is a station on Line 1 and Line 4 of the Shenyang Metro. The station opened on 27 September 2010.

== Station Layout ==
G	Entrances and Exits	Exits A-C, E-G, L
B1	Concourse	Faregates, Station Agent
B2	Westbound	← Line 1 towards Shisanhaojie (Shenyangzhan)
B2	Island platform, doors open on the left
B2	Eastbound	Line 1 towards Shuangma (Nanshichang) →
B3	Northbound	← Line 4 towards Zhengxinlu (Shifudalu)
B3	Island platform, doors open on the left
B3	Southbound	Line 4 towards Chuangxinlu (Nanwumalu) →
