= Yunfengbeijie station =

Shenyang Metro station

Yunfengbeijie 云峰北街 metro
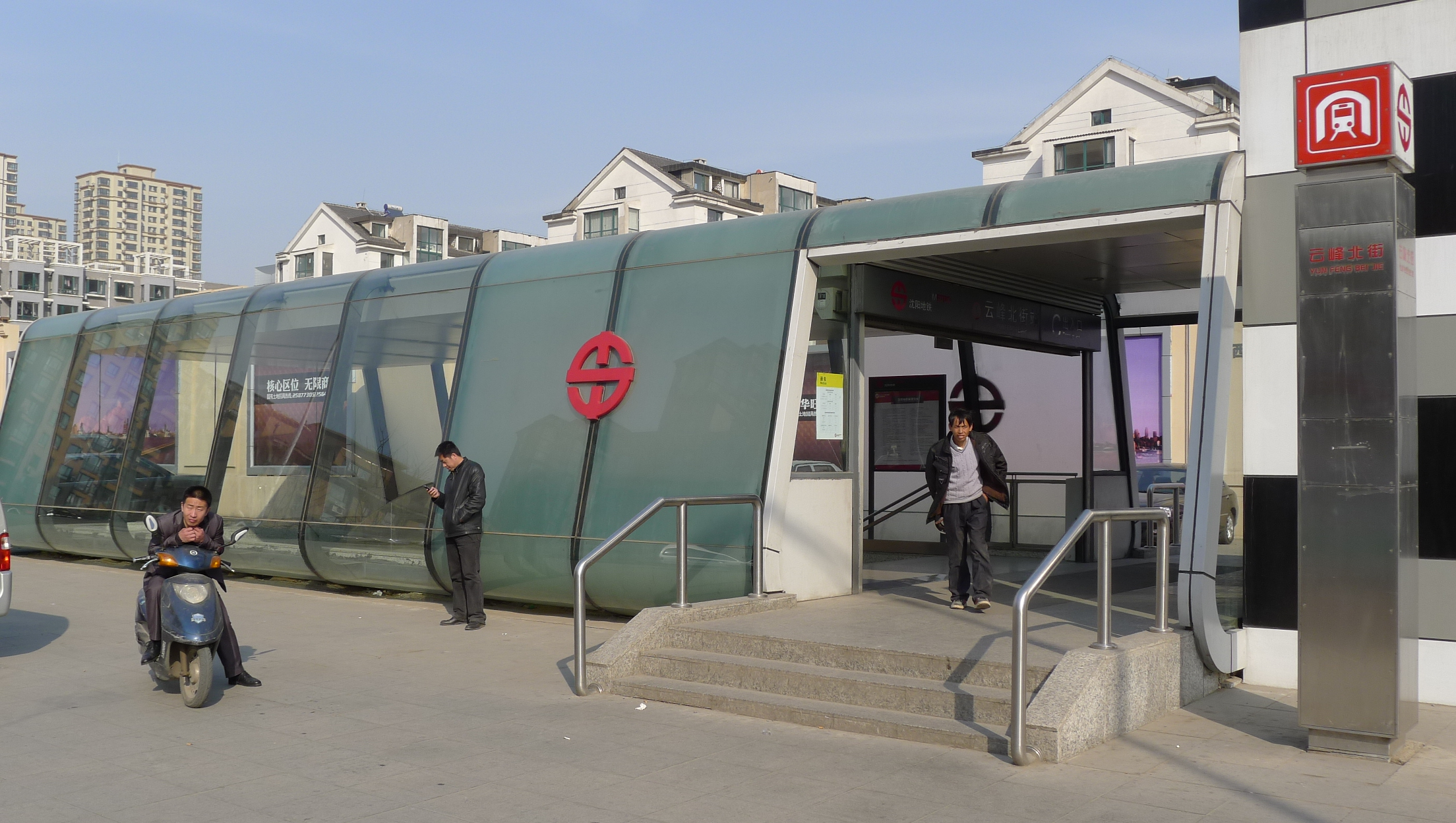
- Entrance C

General information
- Location: Intersection of Yunfeng North St. and Beisi East Rd. Tiexi District, Shenyang, Liaoning; China
- Coordinates: 41°47′47″N 123°22′50″E
- Operator: Shenyang Metro
- Line: Line 1
- Platforms: 2

Construction
- Structure type: Underground
- Accessible: Yes

Other information
- Station code: L1/10

History
- Opened: 27 September 2010; 15 years ago

Services
Preceding station	Shenyang Metro	Following station
Tiexiguangchang towards Shisanhaojie	Line 1	Shenyangzhan towards Shuangma
Location

Yunfengbeijie (Chinese: 云峰北街站; pinyin: Yúnfēngběijiē Zhàn) is a station on Line 1 of the Shenyang Metro. The station opened on 27 September 2010.

== Station Layout ==
G	Entrances and Exits	Exits C-D
B1	Concourse	Faregates, Station Agent
B2	Westbound	← Line 1 towards Shisanhaojie (Tiexiguangchang)
B2	Island platform, doors open on the left
B2	Eastbound	Line 1 towards Shuangma (Shenyangzhan) →
