= Yuhongguangchang station =

Shenyang Metro station

Yuhongguangchang 于洪广场 metro
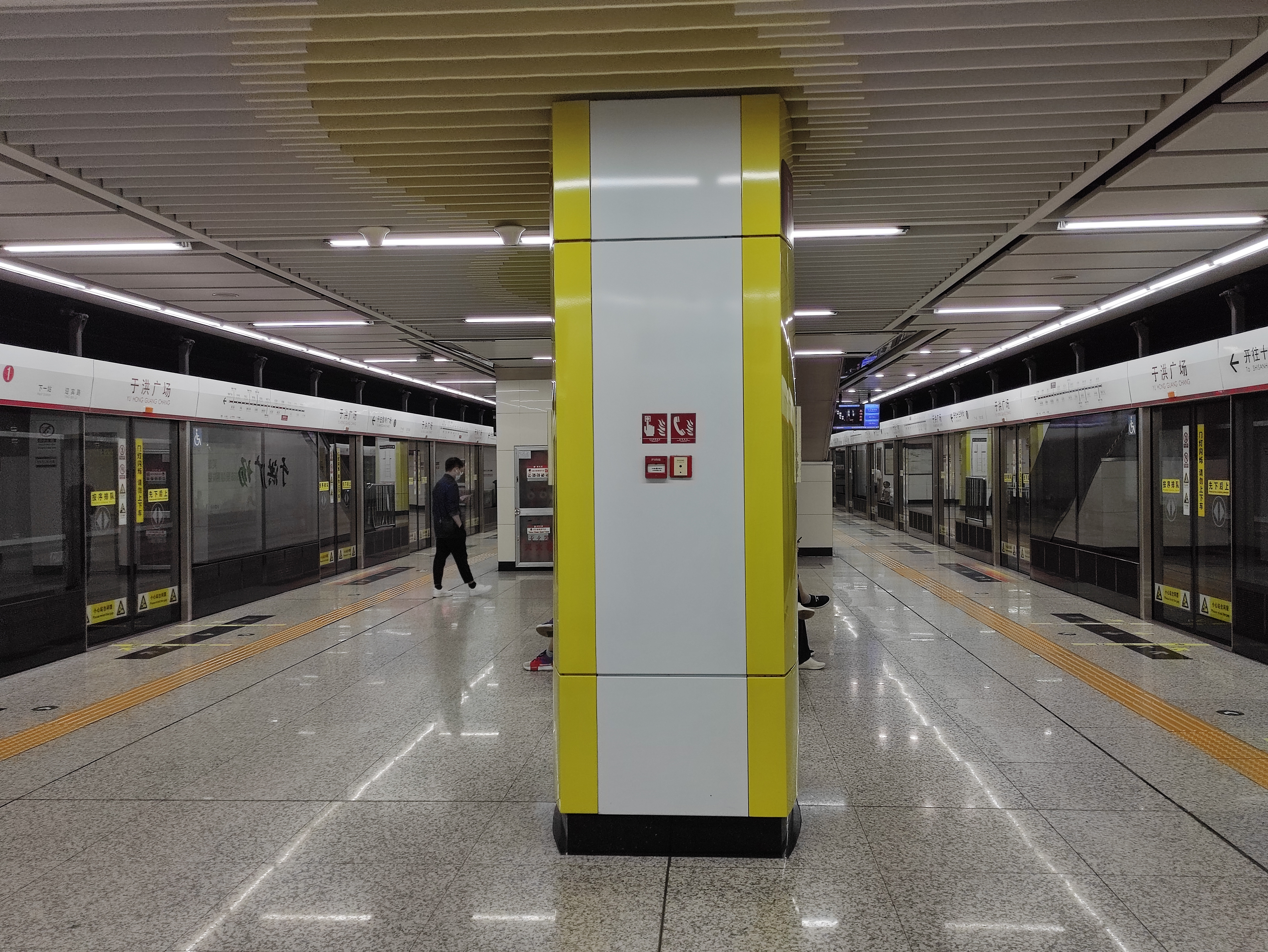
- Platform in August 2021

General information
- Location: Intersection of Huanghai Rd. and Taihu St. Yuhong District, Shenyang, Liaoning; China
- Coordinates: 41°47′40″N 123°18′20″E
- Operator: Shenyang Metro
- Line: Line 1
- Platforms: 2

Construction
- Structure type: Underground
- Accessible: Yes

Other information
- Station code: L1/16

History
- Opened: 27 September 2010; 15 years ago

Services
Preceding station	Shenyang Metro	Following station
Kaifadadao towards Shisanhaojie	Line 1	Yingbinlu towards Shuangma
Location

Yuhongguangchang (Chinese: 于洪广场站; pinyin: Yúhóngguǎngchǎng Zhàn) is a station on Line 1 of the Shenyang Metro. The station opened on 27 September 2010.

== Station Layout ==
G	Entrances and Exits	Exits A-C
B1	Concourse	Faregates, Station Agent
B2	Westbound	← Line 1 towards Shisanhaojie (Kaifadadao)
B2	Island platform, doors open on the left
B2	Eastbound	Line 1 towards Shuangma (Yingbinlu) →
