= Qihaojie station =

Shenyang Metro station

Qihaojie 七号街
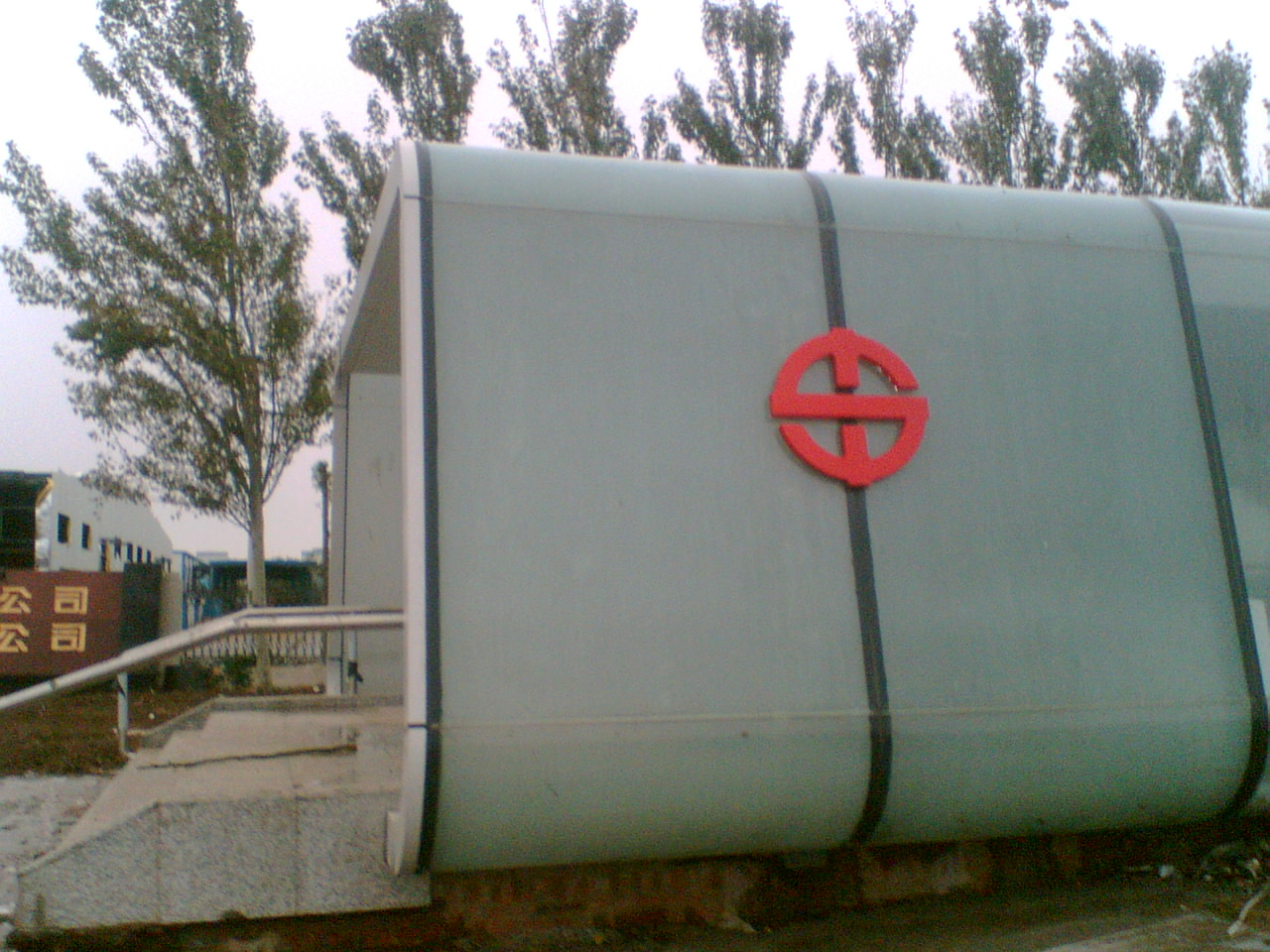
- One of the entrances

General information
- Location: Intersection of Kaifa Rd. and No. 7 St. Tiexi District, Shenyang, Liaoning; China
- Coordinates: 41°45′55″N 123°15′34″E
- Operator: Shenyang Metro
- Line: Line 1
- Platforms: 2

Construction
- Structure type: Underground
- Accessible: Yes

Other information
- Station code: L1/20

History
- Opened: 27 September 2010; 15 years ago

Services
Preceding station	Shenyang Metro	Following station
Zhongyangdajie towards Shisanhaojie	Line 1	Sihaojie towards Shuangma
Location

Qihaojie (Chinese: 七号街站; pinyin: Qīhàojiē Zhàn) is a station on Line 1 of the Shenyang Metro. The station opened on 27 September 2010.

== Station layout ==
G	Entrances and exits	Exits A-D
M	Mezzanine
B1	Concourse	Faregates, station agent
B1	Side platform, doors open on the right
B1	Westbound	← Line 1 towards Shisanhaojie (Zhongyangdajie)
B1	Eastbound	Line 1 towards Shuangma (Sihaojie) →
B1	Side platform, doors open on the right
B1	Concourse	Faregates, station agent
