= Sihaojie station =

Shenyang Metro station

Sihaojie 四号街 metro
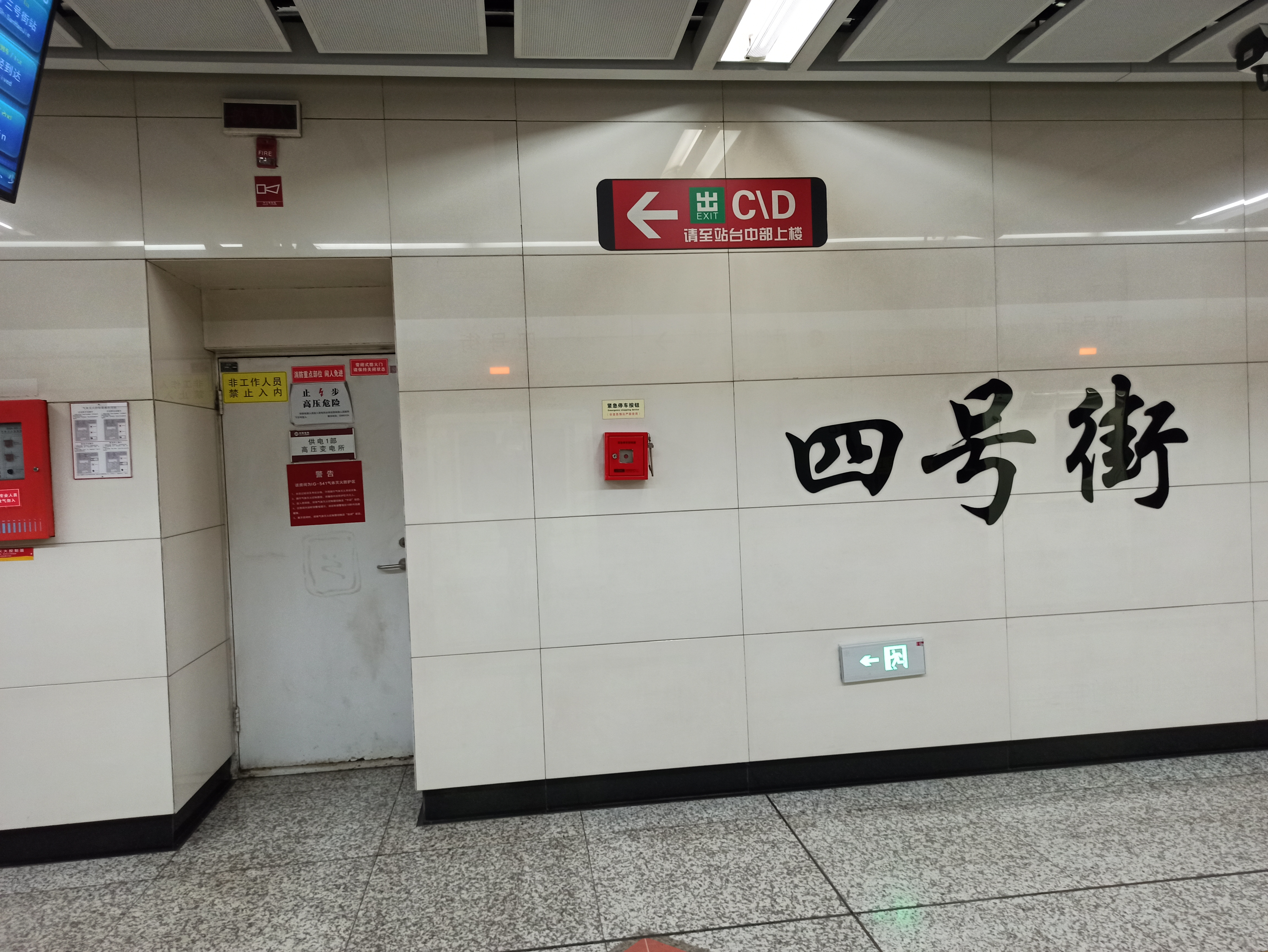

General information
- Location: Intersection of Kaifa Rd. and No. 3 St. Tiexi District, Shenyang, Liaoning; China
- Coordinates: 41°45′57″N 123°16′37″E
- Operator: Shenyang Metro
- Line: Line 1
- Platforms: 2

Construction
- Structure type: Underground
- Accessible: Yes

Other information
- Station code: L1/19

History
- Opened: 27 September 2010; 15 years ago

Services
Preceding station	Shenyang Metro	Following station
Qihaojie towards Shisanhaojie	Line 1	Zhangshi towards Shuangma
Location

Sihaojie (Chinese: 四号街站; pinyin: Sīhàojiē Zhàn) is a station on Line 1 of the Shenyang Metro. The station opened on 27 September 2010.

== Station Layout ==
G	Entrances and Exits	Exits A-D
M	Mezzanine
B1	Concourse	Faregates, Station Agent
B1	Side platform, doors open on the right
B1	Westbound	← Line 1 towards Shisanhaojie (Qihaojie)
B1	Eastbound	Line 1 towards Shuangma (Zhangshi) →
B1	Side platform, doors open on the right
B1	Concourse	Faregates, Station Agent
