= Yingbinlu station =

Shenyang Metro station

Yingbinlu 迎宾路 metro
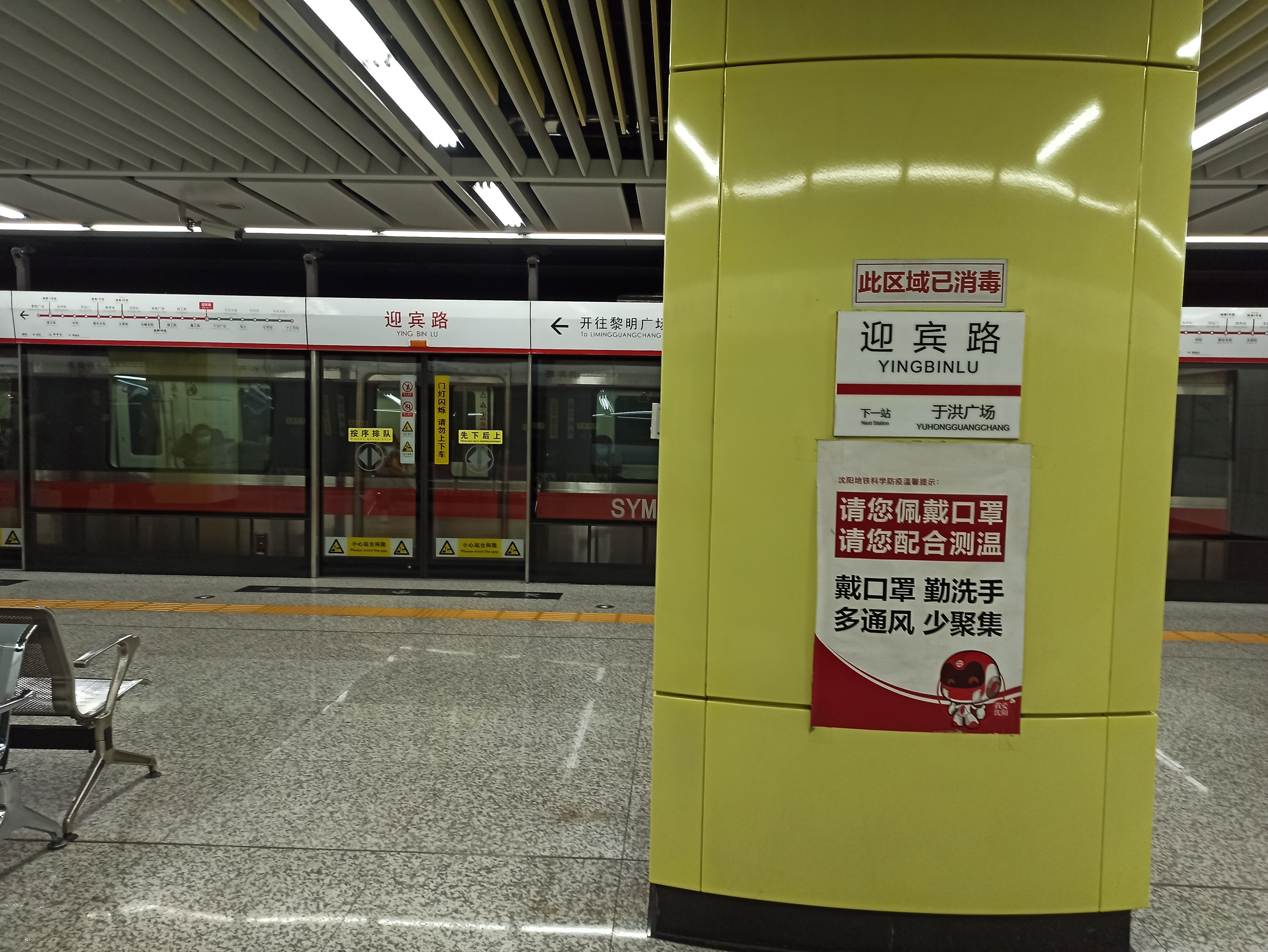

General information
- Location: Intersection of Shenda Rd. and Honghu St. Yuhong District, Shenyang, Liaoning; China
- Coordinates: 41°48′06″N 123°18′35″E
- Operator: Shenyang Metro
- Line: Line 1
- Platforms: 2

Construction
- Structure type: Underground
- Accessible: Yes

Other information
- Station code: L1/15

History
- Opened: 27 September 2010; 15 years ago

Services
Preceding station	Shenyang Metro	Following station
Yuhongguangchang towards Shisanhaojie	Line 1	Zhonggongjie towards Shuangma
Location

Yingbinlu (Chinese: 迎宾路站; pinyin: Yíngbīnlù Zhàn) is a station on Line 1 of the Shenyang Metro. The station opened on 27 September 2010.

== Station Layout ==
G	Entrances and Exits	Exits A-C
B1	Concourse	Faregates, Station Agent
B2	Westbound	← Line 1 towards Shisanhaojie (Yuhongguangchang)
B2	Island platform, doors open on the left
B2	Eastbound	Line 1 towards Shuangma (Zhonggongjie) →
