= Qigongjie station =

Shenyang Metro station

Qigongjie 启工街
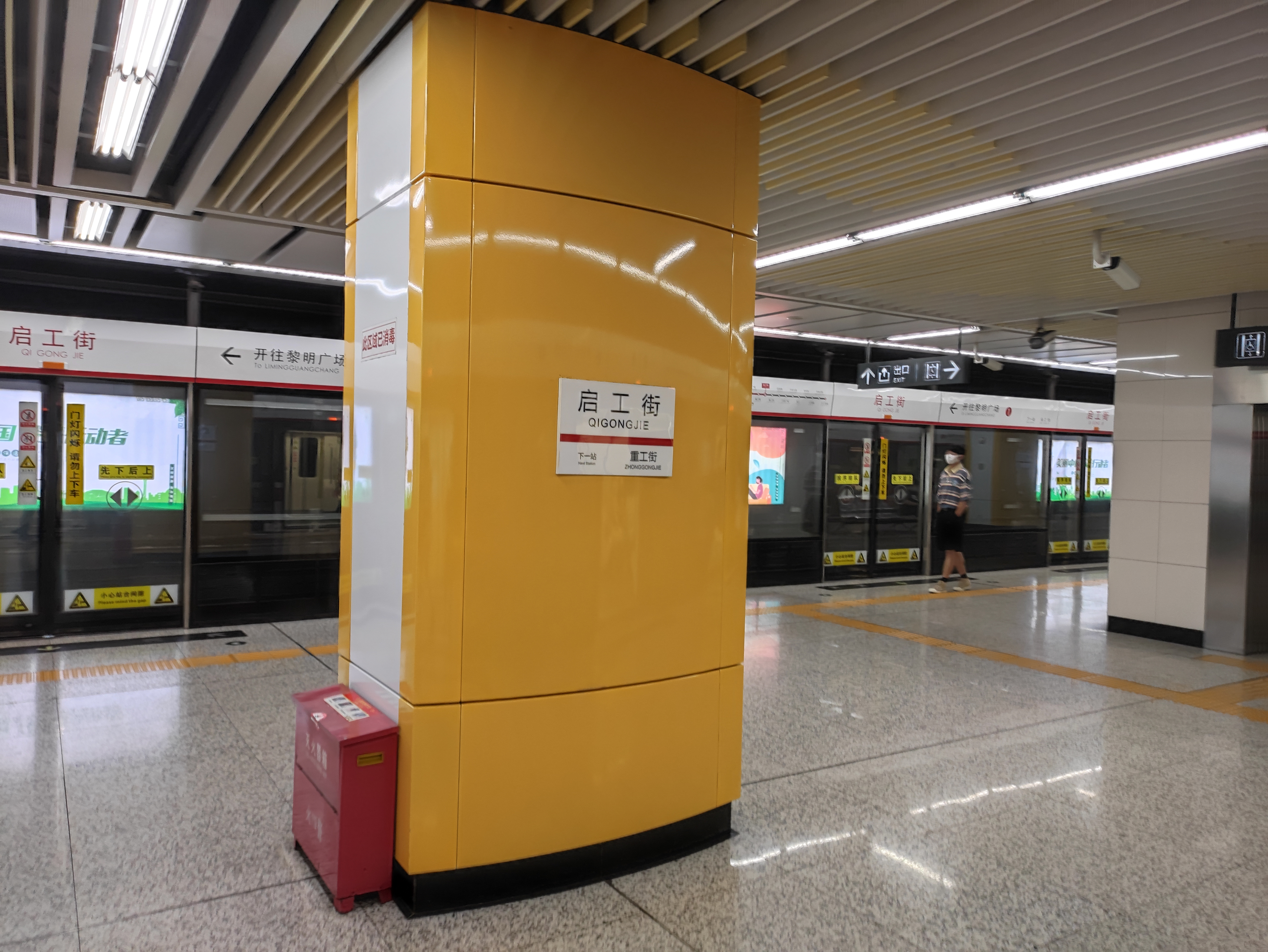
- Platform in August 2021

General information
- Location: Intersection of Jianshe West Rd. and Qigong St. Tiexi District, Shenyang; China
- Coordinates: 41°48′14″N 123°20′36″E
- Operator: Shenyang Metro
- Line: Line 1
- Platforms: 2

Construction
- Structure type: Underground
- Accessible: Yes

Other information
- Station code: L1/13

History
- Opened: 27 September 2010; 15 years ago

Services
Preceding station	Shenyang Metro	Following station
Zhonggongjie towards Shisanhaojie	Line 1	Baogongjie towards Shuangma
Location

Qigongjie (Chinese: 启工街站; pinyin: Qǐgōngjiē Zhàn) is a station on Line 1 of the Shenyang Metro. The station opened on 27 September 2010.

== Station Layout ==
G	Entrances and Exits	Exits A-C
B1	Concourse	Faregates, Station Agent
B2	Westbound	← Line 1 towards Shisanhaojie (Zhonggongjie)
B2	Island platform, doors open on the left
B2	Eastbound	Line 1 towards Shuangma (Baogongjie) →
