= Zhonggongjie station =

Shenyang Metro station

Zhonggongjie 重工街 metro
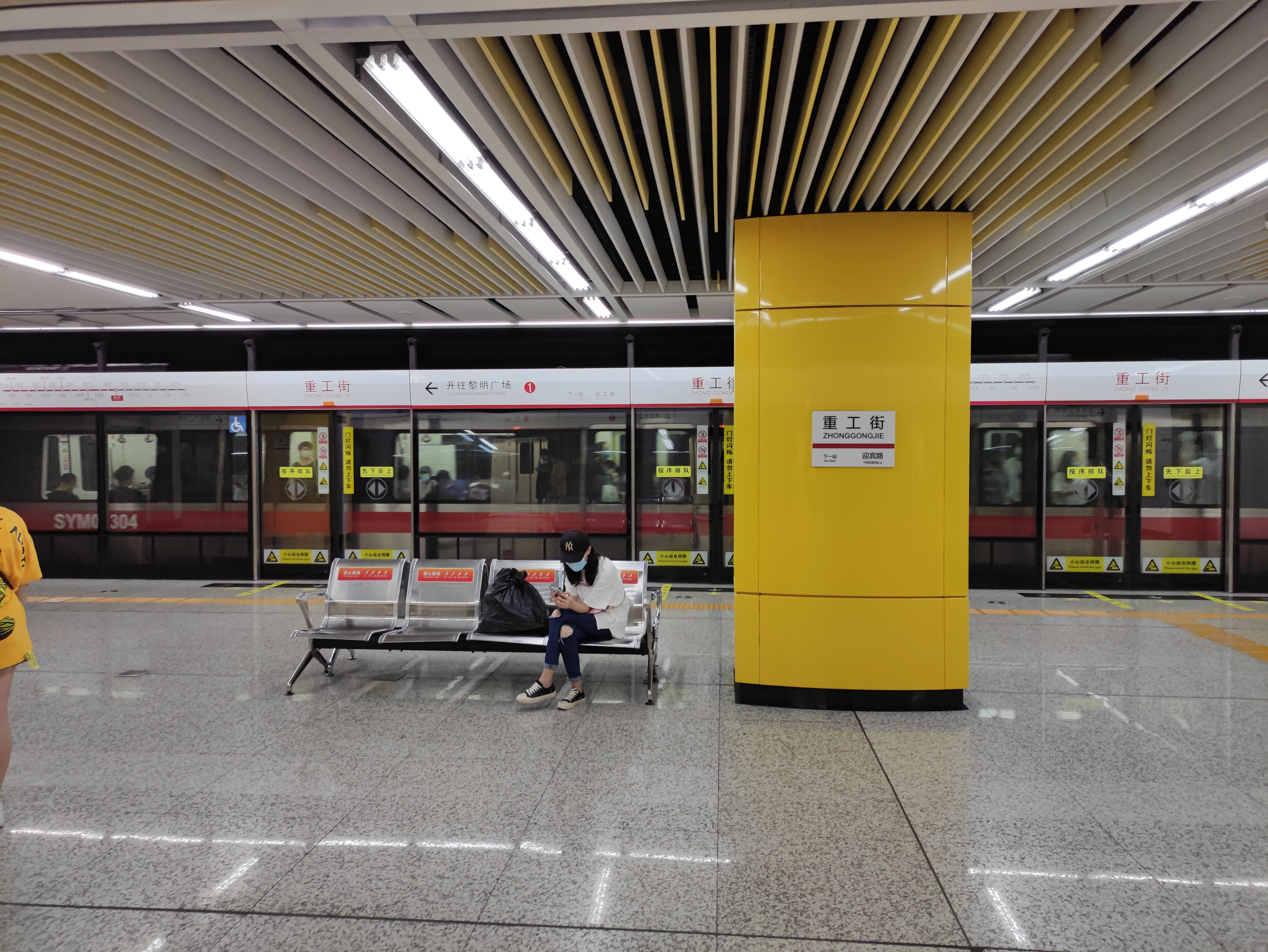
- Platform in August 2021

General information
- Location: Intersection of Jianshe West Rd. and Zhaogong St. Tiexi District, Shenyang, Liaoning; China
- Coordinates: 41°48′18″N 123°19′52″E
- Operator: Shenyang Metro
- Line: Line 1
- Platforms: 2

Construction
- Structure type: Underground
- Accessible: Yes

Other information
- Station code: L1/14

History
- Opened: 27 September 2010; 15 years ago

Services
Preceding station	Shenyang Metro	Following station
Yingbinlu towards Shisanhaojie	Line 1	Qigongjie towards Shuangma
Location

Zhonggongjie (Chinese: 重工街站; pinyin: Zhònggōngjiē Zhàn) is a station on Line 1 of the Shenyang Metro. The station opened on 27 September 2010.

== Station Layout ==
G	Entrances and Exits	Exits A-C
B1	Concourse	Faregates, Station Agent
B2	Westbound	← Line 1 towards Shisanhaojie (Yingbinlu)
B2	Island platform, doors open on the left
B2	Eastbound	Line 1 towards Shuangma (Qigongjie) →
