= Zhongyangdajie station =

Shenyang Metro station

Zhongyangdajie 中央大街 metro
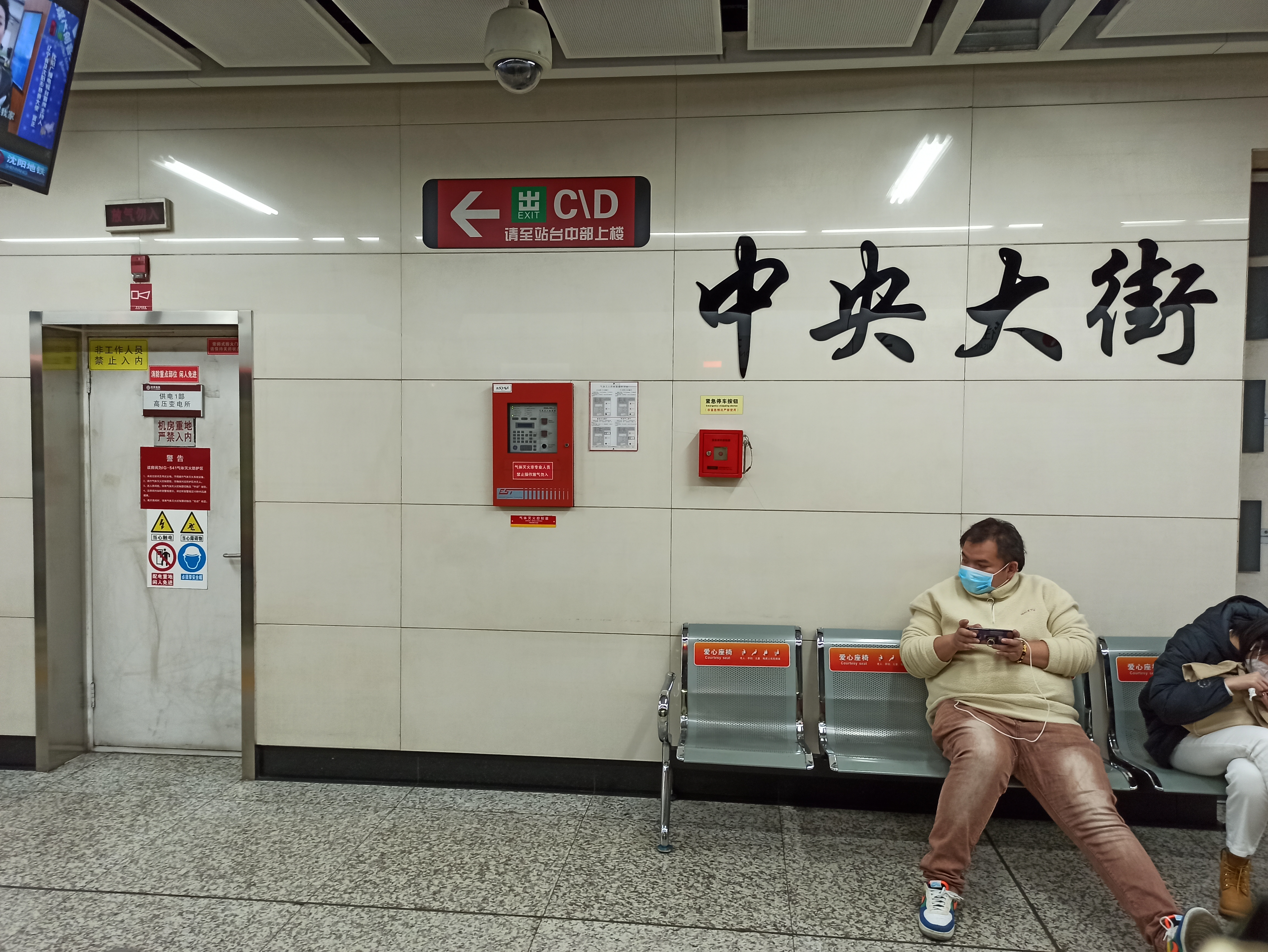

General information
- Location: Intersection of Kaifa Rd. and Zhongyang St. Tiexi District, Shenyang, Liaoning; China
- Coordinates: 41°45′56″N 123°14′32″E
- Operator: Shenyang Metro
- Line: Line 1
- Platforms: 2

Construction
- Structure type: Underground
- Accessible: Yes

Other information
- Station code: L1/21

History
- Opened: 27 September 2010; 15 years ago

Services
Preceding station	Shenyang Metro	Following station
Shisanhaojie Terminus	Line 1	Qihaojie towards Shuangma
Location

Zhongyangdajie (Chinese: 中央大街站; pinyin: Zhōngyāngdàjiē Zhàn) is a station on Line 1 of the Shenyang Metro. The station opened on 27 September 2010.

== Station Layout ==
G	Entrances and Exits	Exits A-D
M	Mezzanine
B1	Concourse	Faregates, Station Agent
B1	Side platform, doors open on the right
B1	Westbound	← Line 1 towards Shisanhaojie (Terminus)
B1	Eastbound	Line 1 towards Shuangma (Qihaojie) →
B1	Side platform, doors open on the right
B1	Concourse	Faregates, Station Agent
