= Dongzhongjie station =

Shenyang Metro station

Dongzhongjie 东中街 metro
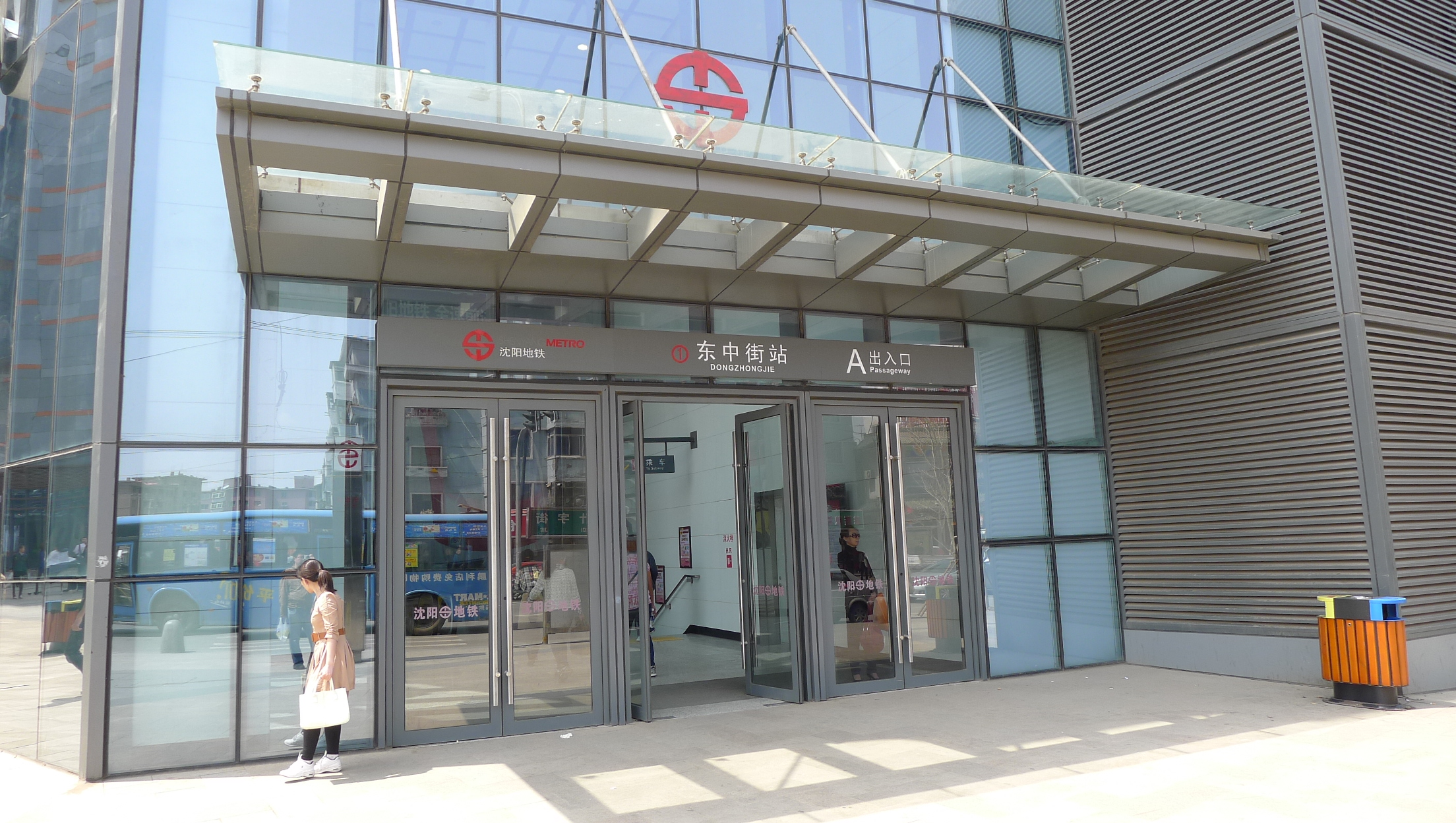
- Exit A

General information
- Location: Intersection of Xiaodong Rd. and Xiaoshizi St. Dadong District, Shenyang, Liaoning; China
- Coordinates: 41°48′10″N 123°28′14″E
- Operator: Shenyang Metro
- Line: Line 1
- Platforms: 2

Construction
- Structure type: Underground
- Accessible: Yes

Other information
- Station code: L1/03

History
- Opened: 27 September 2010; 15 years ago

Services
Preceding station	Shenyang Metro	Following station
Zhongjie towards Shisanhaojie	Line 1	Pangjiangjie towards Shuangma
Location

Dongzhongjie (Chinese: 东中街站; pinyin: Dōngzhōngjiē Zhàn) is a station on Line 1 of the Shenyang Metro. The station opened on 27 September 2010.

== Station Layout ==
G	Entrances and Exits	Exits A-D
B1	Concourse	Faregates, Station Agent
B2	Westbound	← Line 1 towards Shisanhaojie (Zhongjie)
B2	Island platform, doors open on the left
B2	Eastbound	Line 1 towards Shuangma (Pangjiangjie) →
