= Zhongjie station =

Shenyang Metro station

Zhongjie 中街 metro
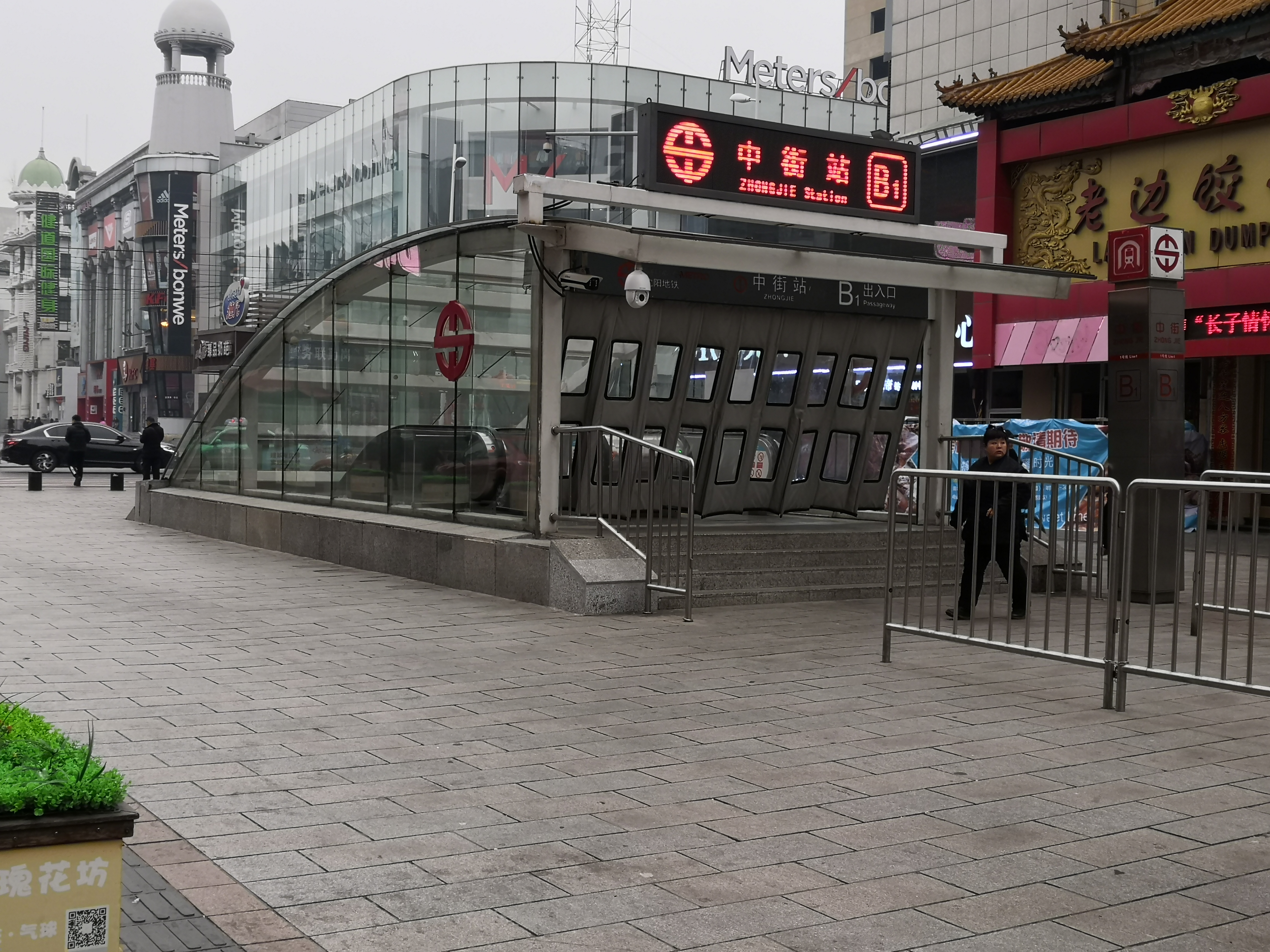
- Exit B1

General information
- Location: Intersection of Zhongjie Rd. and Chaoyang St. Shenhe District, Shenyang, Liaoning; China
- Coordinates: 41°48′05″N 123°27′42″E
- Operator: Shenyang Metro
- Line: Line 1
- Platforms: 2

Construction
- Structure type: Underground
- Accessible: Yes

Other information
- Station code: L1/04

History
- Opened: 27 September 2010; 15 years ago

Services
Preceding station	Shenyang Metro	Following station
Huaiyuanmen towards Shisanhaojie	Line 1	Dongzhongjie towards Shuangma
Location

Zhongjie (Chinese: 中街站; pinyin: Zhōngjiē Zhàn) is a station on Line 1 of the Shenyang Metro. The station opened on 27 September 2010.

== Station Layout ==
G	Entrances and Exits	Exits A-C
B1	Concourse	Faregates, Station Agent
B2	Westbound	← Line 1 towards Shisanhaojie (Huaiyuanmen)
B2	Island platform, doors open on the left
B2	Eastbound	Line 1 towards Shuangma (Dongzhongjie) →
