= Line 1 (Shenyang Metro) =

Metro line in Shenyang, China

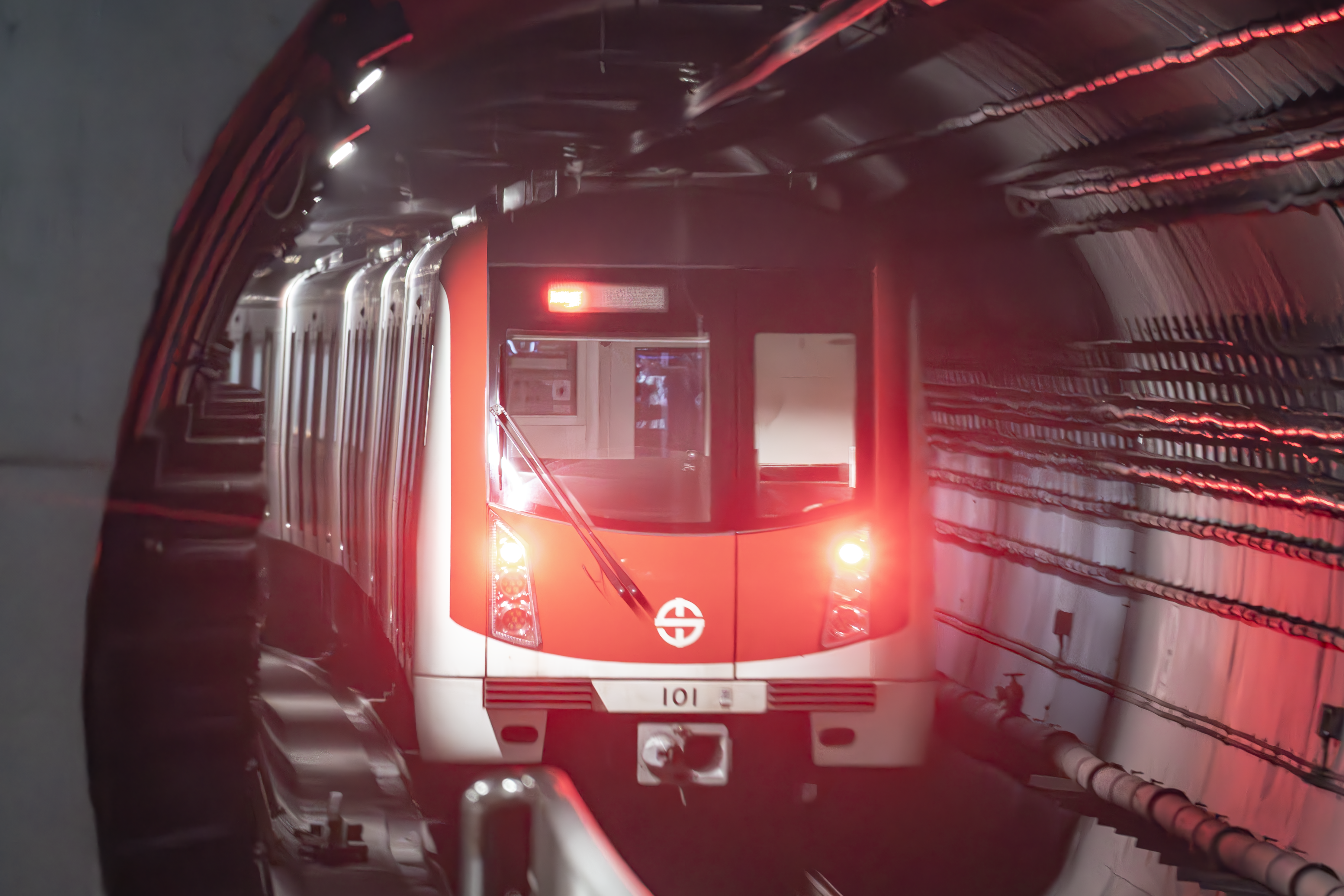
- Line 1 train

Overview
- Status: Operational
- Owner: Shenyang
- Locale: Shenyang, Liaoning, China
- Termini: Shisanhaojie; Shuangma
- Stations: 32

Service
- Type: Rapid transit
- System: Shenyang Metro
- Services: 1
- Operator(s): Shenyang Metro Corporation

History
- Opened: 27 September 2010; 15 years ago

Technical
- Line length: 43.95 km (27.31 mi)
- Number of tracks: 2
- Character: Underground
- Track gauge: 1,435 mm (4 ft 8 1/2 in)

Line 1 of the Shenyang Metro (Chinese: 沈阳地铁一号线; pinyin: Shěnyáng Dìtiě Yī Hào Xiàn) is a rapid transit line running from west to east Shenyang. It was opened on 27 September 2010. This line is 43.95 km long with 32 stations.

A 16.15 km (10.04 mi) eastern extension, consisting of 10 stations, started construction on 26 December 2020, and opened on 30 June 2025.

== Opening timeline ==
| Segment | Commencement | Length | Station(s) | Name |
|---|---|---|---|---|
| Shisanhaojie — Limingguangchang | 27 September 2010 | 27.8 km (17.27 mi) | 22 | Phase 1 |
| Limingguangchang — Shuangma | 30 June 2025 | 16.15 km (10.04 mi) | 10 | Phase 2 |

== Stations (west to east) ==
| station name | | Transfer | Distance km | | Location |
| Pinyin | Chinese | Transfer | Distance km | | Location |
|---|---|---|---|---|---|
| Shisanhaojie | 十三号街 | | 0.00 | 0.00 | Tiexi |
| Zhongyangdajie | 中央大街 | | 1.00 | 1.00 | Tiexi |
| Qihaojie | 七号街 | | 1.40 | 2.40 | Tiexi |
| Sihaojie | 四号街 | | 1.50 | 3.90 | Tiexi |
| Zhangshi | 张士 | | 1.55 | 5.45 | Tiexi |
| Kaifadadao | 开发大道 | | 1.40 | 6.85 | Tiexi |
| Yuhongguangchang | 于洪广场 | | 1.50 | 8.35 | Yuhong |
| Yingbinlu | 迎宾路 | | 1.00 | 9.35 | Yuhong |
| Zhonggongjie | 重工街 | | 1.95 | 11.30 | Tiexi |
| Qigongjie | 启工街 | | 1.05 | 12.35 | Tiexi |
| Baogongjie | 保工街 | | 1.00 | 13.35 | Tiexi |
| Tiexiguangchang | 铁西广场 | 9 | 1.40 | 14.75 | Tiexi |
| Yunfengbeijie | 云峰北街 | | 1.15 | 15.90 | Tiexi |
| Shenyangzhan | 沈阳站 | SYT | 1.60 | 17.50 | Heping |
| Taiyuanjie | 太原街 | 4 | 0.95 | 18.45 | Heping |
| Nanshichang | 南市场 | | 1.20 | 19.65 | Heping |
| Qingniandajie | 青年大街 | 2 | 1.10 | 20.75 | Shenhe |
| Huaiyuanmen | 怀远门 | | 1.30 | 22.05 | Shenhe |
| Zhongjie | 中街 | | 1.35 | 23.40 | Shenhe |
| Dongzhongjie | 东中街 | | 0.75 | 24.15 | Dadong |
| Pangjiangjie | 滂江街 | 10 | 1.65 | 25.80 | Dadong |
| Limingguangchang | 黎明广场 | | 1.30 | 27.10 | Dadong |
| Xinhuijie | 新惠街 | | | | Shenhe |
| Xinningjie | 新宁街 | | | | Shenhe |
| Dongdayingjie | 东大营街 | | | | Shenhe |
| Nongyedaxue | 农业大学 | | | | Shenhe |
| Qianling | 前陵 | | | | Hunnan |
| Donglinggongyuan | 东陵公园 | | | | Hunnan |
| Shuiquan | 水泉 | | | | Hunnan |
| Boguanbeidajie | 伯官北大街 | | | | Hunnan |
| Zhiwuyuan | 植物园 | | | | Hunnan |
| Shuangma | 双马 | | | | Hunnan |

== Rolling stock ==
| Type | Time of manufacturing | Series | Sets | Assembly | Notes |
|---|---|---|---|---|---|
| Type B | 2008 - 2010 | DKZ17 | 23 | Tc+Mp+M+T+Mp+Tc | Manufactured by Changchun Railway Vehicles |
