= Shisanhaojie station =

Shenyang Metro station

Shisanhaojie 十三号街 metro
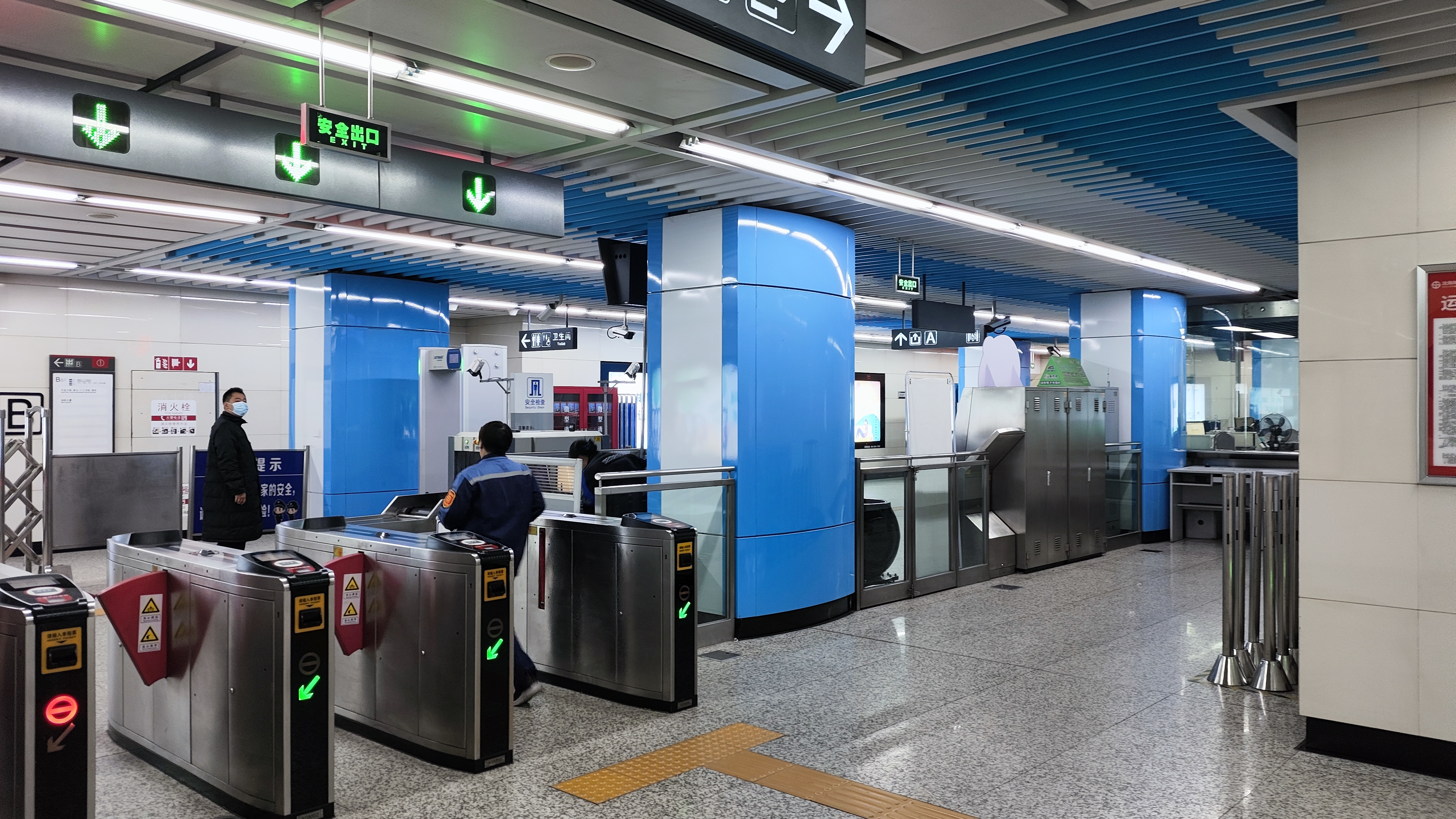

General information
- Location: Intersection of Kaifa Rd. and No. 13 St. Tiexi District, Shenyang, Liaoning; China
- Coordinates: 41°45′56″N 123°13′48″E
- Operator: Shenyang Metro
- Line: Line 1
- Platforms: 2

Construction
- Structure type: Underground
- Accessible: Yes

Other information
- Station code: L1/22

History
- Opened: 27 September 2010; 15 years ago

Services
Preceding station	Shenyang Metro	Following station
Terminus	Line 1	Zhongyangdajie towards Shuangma
Location

Shisanhaojie (Chinese: 十三号街站; pinyin: Shísānhàojiē Zhàn) is a station and the western terminus on Line 1 of the Shenyang Metro. The station opened on 27 September 2010.

== Station Layout ==
G	Entrances and Exits	Exits A-D
M	Mezzanine
B1	Concourse	Faregates, Station Agent
B1	Side platform, doors open on the right
B1	Westbound	← Line 1 termination track
B1	Eastbound	Line 1 towards Shuangma (Zhongyangdajie) →
B1	Side platform, doors open on the right
B1	Concourse	Faregates, Station Agent
