= Huanggutun station =

Huanggutun station can refer to:

- Huanggutun railway station, a railway station closed in 2018.
- Huanggutunzhan station, a metro station under construction on Line 9 of Shenyang Metro.
