= Zhongxingwenhuaguangchang station =

Shenyang Metro station

Zhongxingwenhuaguangchang 重型文化广场 metro
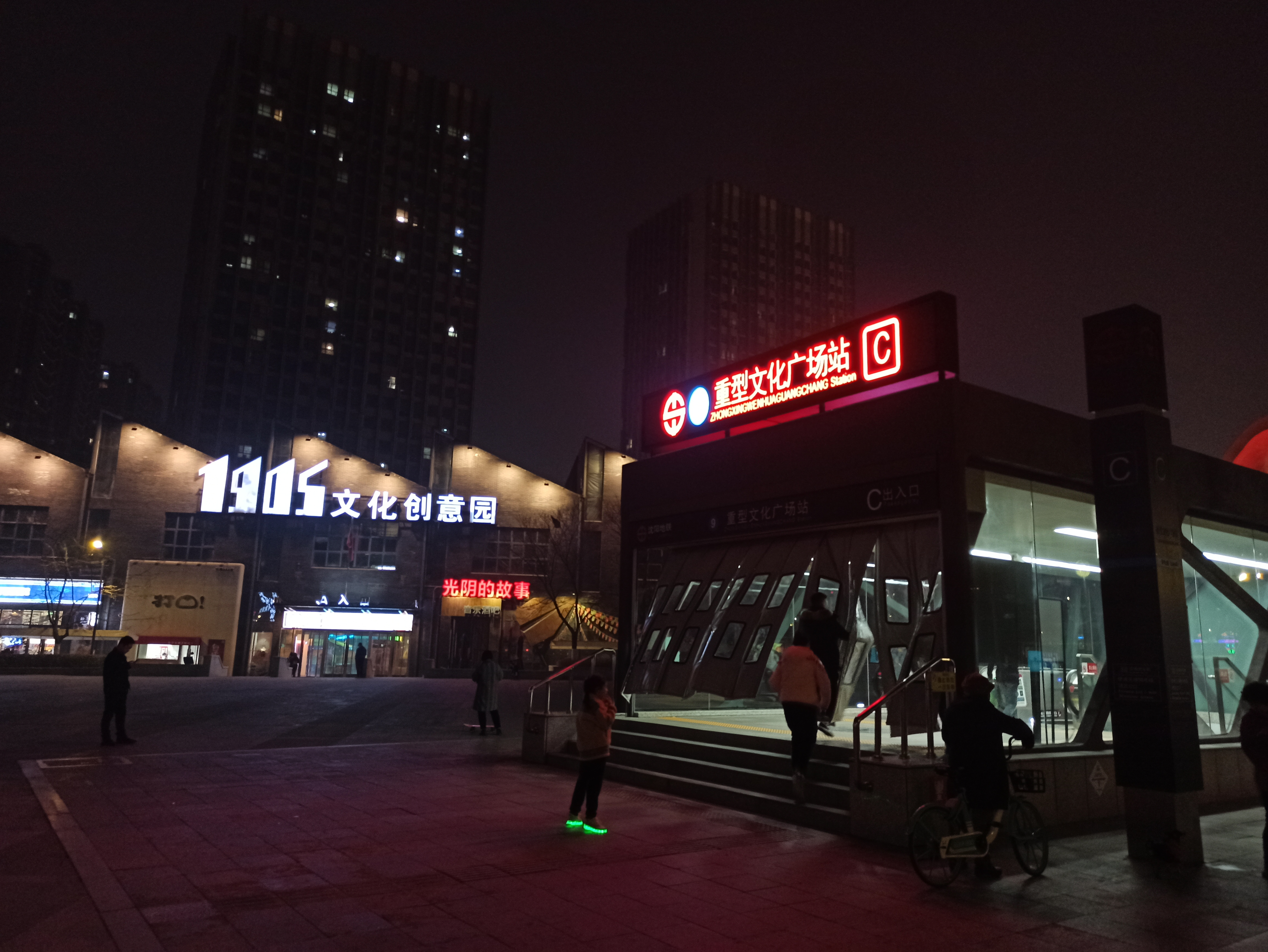

General information
- Location: Intersection of Beiyi Rd. and Xinghua North St. Tiexi District, Shenyang, Liaoning; China
- Coordinates: 41.81049°N 123.37775°E
- Operator: Shenyang Metro
- Line: Line 9
- Platforms: 2

Construction
- Structure type: Underground
- Accessible: Yes

History
- Opened: 25 May 2019; 7 years ago

Services
Preceding station	Shenyang Metro	Following station
Huanggutunzhan towards Nujianggongyuan	Line 9	Beierlu towards Jianzhudaxue
Location

Zhongxingwenhuaguangchang (Chinese: 重型文化广场站; pinyin: Zhòngxíngwénhuàguǎngchǎng Zhàn) is a station on Line 9 of the Shenyang Metro. The station opened on 25 May 2019.

== Station Layout ==
G	Entrances and Exits	Exits A-C
B1	Concourse	Faregates, Station Agent
B2	Northbound	← Line 9 towards Nujianggongyuan (Huanggutunzhan)
B2	Island platform, doors open on the left
B2	Southbound	Line 9 towards Jianzhudaxue (Beierlu) →
