= Huanggutunzhan station =

Shenyang Metro station

Huangguntunzhan 皇姑屯站 metro
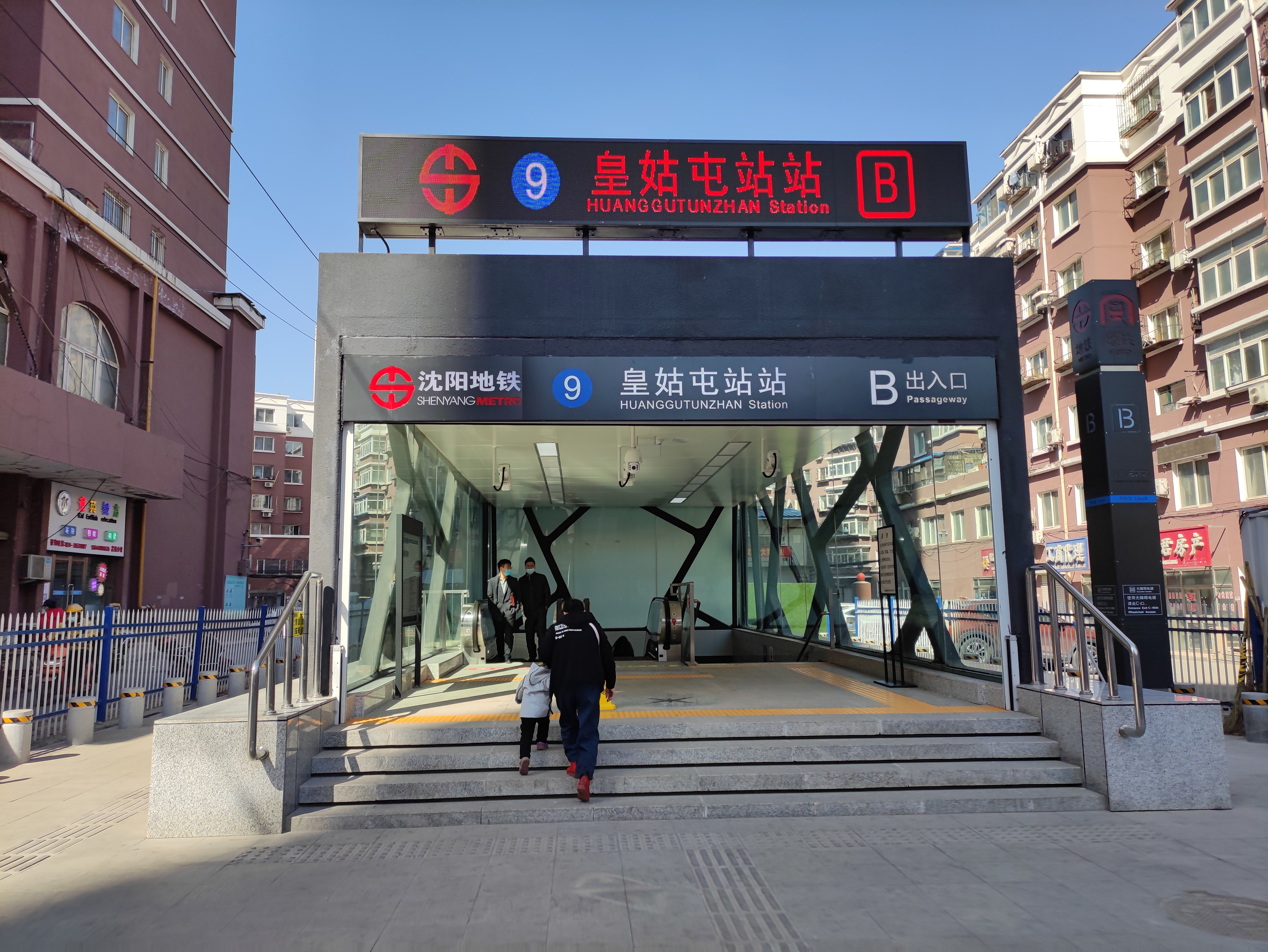

General information
- Location: Intersection of Huaihe St. and Jingshan Rd. Yuhong District, Shenyang, Liaoning; China
- Operator: Shenyang Metro
- Line: Line 9
- Platforms: 2

Construction
- Structure type: Underground
- Accessible: Yes

History
- Opened: 30 March 2021; 5 years ago

Services
Preceding station	Shenyang Metro	Following station
Huaihejieshenyieryuan towards Nujianggongyuan	Line 9	Zhongxingwenhuaguangchang towards Jianzhudaxue
Location

Huanggutunzhan (Chinese: 皇姑屯站站; pinyin: Huánggūtúnzhàn Zhàn) is a station on Line 9 of the Shenyang Metro. The station did not open with the rest of Phase 1 of Line 9 due to demolition work. The station was opened on 30 March 2021.

== Station Layout ==
G	Entrances and Exits	Exits A-C
B1	Concourse	Faregates, Station Agent
B2	Northbound	← Line 9 towards Nujianggongyuan (Huaihejieshenyieryuan)
B2	Island platform, doors open on the left
B2	Southbound	Line 9 towards Jianzhudaxue (Zhongxingwenhuaguangchang) →
