= Jinyangdajie station =

Shenyang Metro station

Jinyangdajie 金阳大街 metro
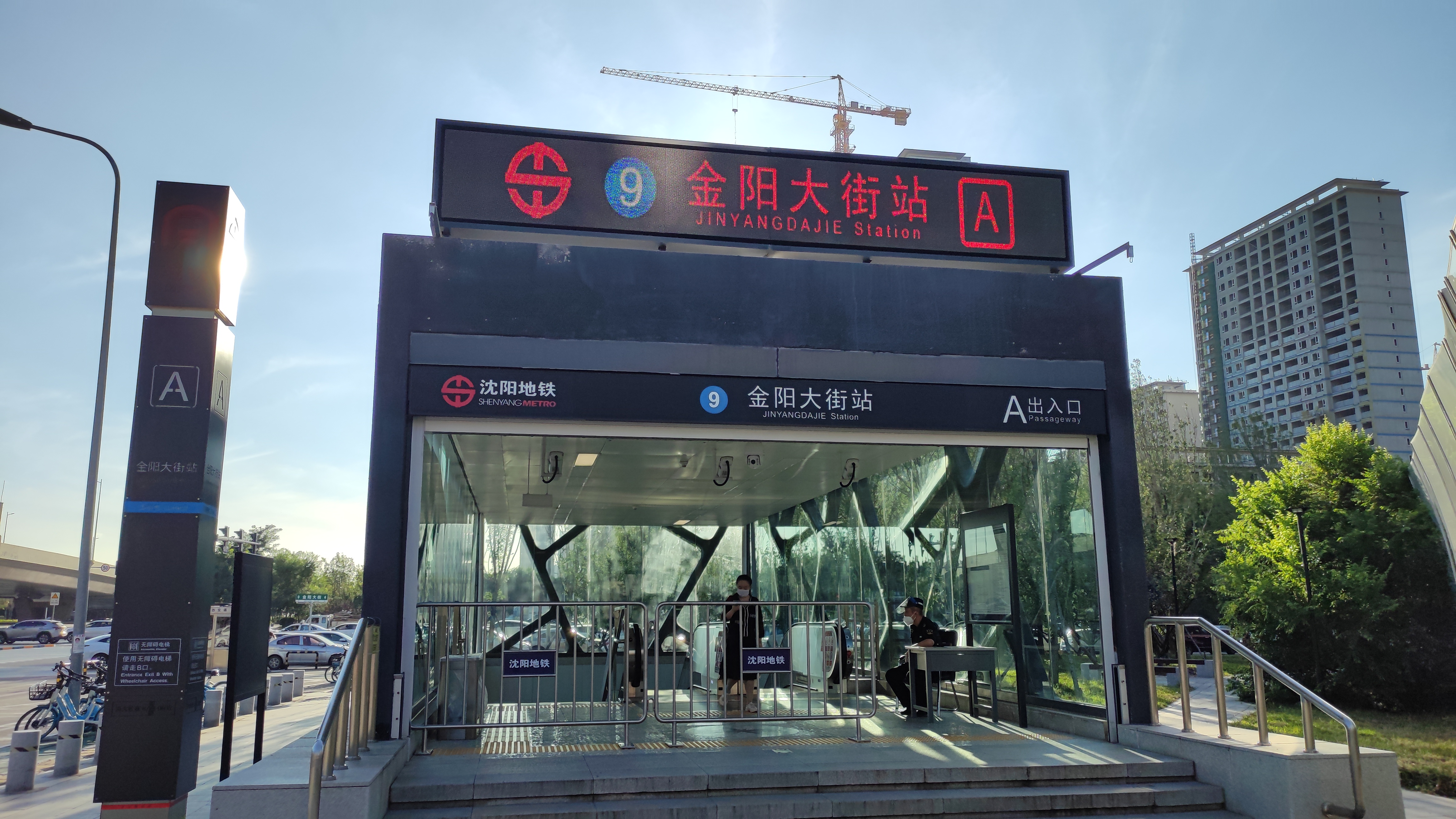

General information
- Location: Intersection of Hunnan Rd. and Jinyang St. Hunnan District, Shenyang, Liaoning; China
- Operator: Shenyang Metro
- Line: Line 9
- Platforms: 2 (1 island platform)

Construction
- Structure type: Underground
- Accessible: Yes

History
- Opened: 25 May 2019; 7 years ago

Services
Preceding station	Shenyang Metro	Following station
Yushutai towards Nujianggongyuan	Line 9	Caixiajie towards Jianzhudaxue
Location

Jinyangdajie (Chinese: 金阳大街站; pinyin: Jīnyángdàjiē Zhàn) is a station on Line 9 of the Shenyang Metro. The station opened on 25 May 2019.

== Station Layout ==
G	Entrances and Exits	Exits A-B
B1	Concourse	Faregates, Station Agent
B2	Northbound	← Line 9 towards Nujianggongyuan (Yushutai)
B2	Island platform, doors open on the left
B2	Southbound	Line 9 towards Jianzhudaxue (Caixiajie) →
