= Port of Yingkou =

Coordinates: 40°16′44″N 122°05′42″E

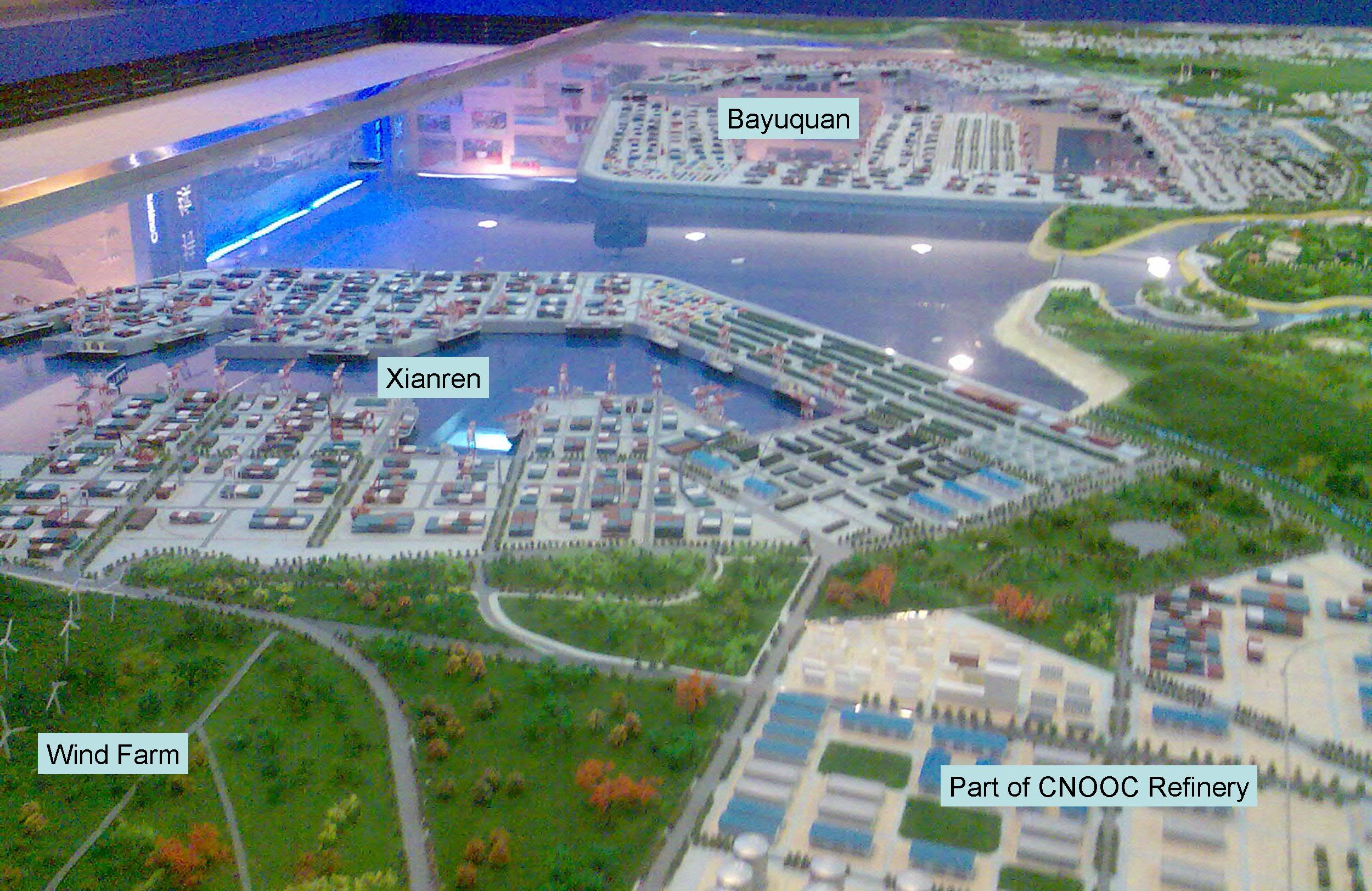
- Model of redevelopment at Yingkou Old Port
- Interactive map of Port of Yingkou

Location
- Country: People's Republic of China
- Location: Yingkou, Liaoning Province, northeastern China

Details
- Opened: 1858
- Operated by: Yingkou Port Group Corporation
- Owned by: People's Republic of China
- No. of berths: 27

Statistics
- Annual cargo tonnage: 21 million metric tons/year
- Annual container volume: 250,000 TEU/year
- Main imports: Grain, coal, steel, vehicles
- Main exports: Container transfers
- Website; Port of Yingkou website

The Port of Yingkou is an international seaport in Yingkou, Liaoning, People's Republic of China. It is the second-largest port in northeast China and the tenth-largest nationwide. It includes two separate dockland areas, the Yingkou old port at the mouth of the Daliao River, and the Bayuquan port located directly on Liaodong Bay on the Bohai Sea.

The port is a major import facility for northeastern China and parts of Mongolia with an annual trade volume of more than 21 million metric tons (MT) through 27 shipping berths. Principal port activities include grain and sugar, timber, oil tar, coal, steel and minerals, and vehicle imports. The port also handles up to 250,000 containers per year.

Yingkou Port Group Co.'s services also include bulk cargo loading, pipeline transportation, railway and highway transportation. Apart from docks it also operates tugboats, pilot boats, barges and communication ships.

== History ==
River and coastal trade have existed in Yingkou since 1280 AD, but international shipping commenced in 1858 with Yingkou's designation as a Treaty Port under the Treaty of Tianjin. The first shipping dock was opened at the mouth of the Liao River in 1864. Over the next ten years additional docks were constructed at the mouths of the Hun and the Tai, collectively forming what is now known as Yingkou old port.

The expiry of the treaty led to a decline in shipping and a reversion to a principally domestic port. The port was revived following the reform and opening up of the late 1970s which led to the construction of the Bayuquan Port on Liandong Bay. These new facilities added 20 more shipping berths with a break bulk capacity of ten million MT a year.

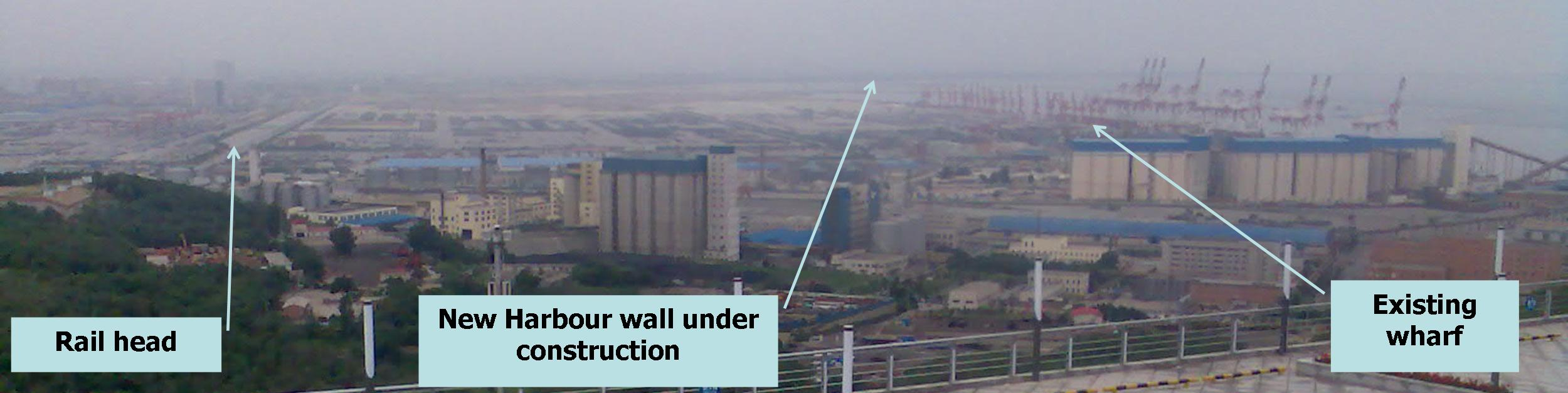
Development at Bayuquan Port, Yingkou (annotated)

In 1996 the Chinese government-owned shipping company COSCO partnered with Yingkou port authorities to develop a container terminal at Bayuquan Port with an annual capacity of 250,000 TEU's. 40,000 containers were handled in the first year of operation, rising to 150,000 by 2000 and reaching the terminal capacity in 2007.

In 2013 Yingkou port announced a 9.8% increase in container throughput to 2.68 million TEU in the first six months of the year. Import and export volume increased to 166.3 million tons, up by 10.7%.

In 2015, Yingkou Port was listed among the top 50 container ports in the world, with a TEU volume of 5.92 million.

In November 2016 a strategic partnership was formed between the Yingkou Port Group Corporation and Russian Railways. The goal of the agreement was to establish a joint international terminal and logistics center in Russia. As part of the agreement Yingkou Port agreed to acquire a 49% stake in the Bely Rast Terminal Logistics Center of Russian Railways.

The port is part of the Maritime Silk Road that runs from the Chinese coast towards the southern tip of India to Mombasa, from there through the Suez Canal to the Mediterranean and there to the Upper Adriatic region of Trieste with its rail connections to Central and Eastern Europe.
