= Daliao River =

Lower reach of Liao River

Coordinates: 40°40′15″N 122°08′58″E

The Daliao River (simplified Chinese: 大辽河; traditional Chinese: 大遼河; pinyin: Dàliáohé, "Great Liao River") is a major river system originating from the Hun River in Fushun city and the Taizi River in Benxi city, both of which are located in Liaoning province, China. Formed by a confluence of three rivers—Dialiao River, Hun River, and Taizi River—the river system flows through Panjin and Yingkou before draining into the Liaodong Bay, located to the west of Yingkou. The Dialiao river tributary has a length of 94 kilometres (58 mi) and covers a catchment area of 1,926 square kilometres (744 sq mi). The Hun and Taizi rivers are 415 kilometres (258 mi) and 413 kilometres (257 mi) long, and drain a land area of 11,500 square kilometres (4,400 sq mi) and 13,900 square kilometres (5,400 sq mi) respectively.

According to various scientific studies, the Daliao River system is one of the most contaminated river systems in China. It receives 1.2 billion tonnes of industrial and domestic wastewater annually. Red tides can be seen forming in the river system from July to September and due to sedimentation the levels of ammonical nitrogen and phosphorus increased in the system substantially. A high amount of Calcium-bound Phosphorus was also observed in the river system.

== History ==
The principal river of southern Northeast China, the Liao River, historically bifurcates into two distributaries near the Liujianfang Hydrological Station (六间房水文站) at Xinkaihe Town (新开河镇) of Anshan's Tai'an County, forming the Liao River Delta. The eastern (left) distributary, called the Wailiao River, was originally the larger one of the two and the main outlet of lower Liao River. It travelled southwards to pick up two large tributaries, the Hun River and Taizi River, at a confluence locally referred as the Trident River (三岔河). After the three rivers merged, the resulting large river became to be known as Daliao River.

However, the low elevation and the flat, waterway-rich (and often rerouting) topography of the Liao River Delta region created a huge problem in flood control. During monsoon seasons the storm surges from the Bohai Sea could go as far inland as the Trident confluence, and when meeting the voluminous upstream water from the Liao River, would frequently exceed the capacity of river channels causing massive spill-over flash floods. This flood risk particularly threatened the cities of Yingkou (which is immediately adjacent to the Daliao River mouth and home to 2 million people) and Haicheng (which has over 1 million residents).

In 1958, a river engineering project was conducted, and the upriver of the Wailiao River at the Liao River bifurcation was blocked off, redirecting the Liao River flow entirely towards the Shuangtaizi River (双台子河), the originally smaller western distributary of the river delta. This separated the Wailiao, Hun and Taizi Rivers from Liao River permanently, making the Daliao River an independent river system since 1958.

== Tributaries ==
=== Wailiao River ===
The Wailiao River (外辽河, "outer Liao River"), was originally the main distributary of Liao River and the principal headwaters of Daliao River, but only an often dry stream channel remains upriver after the 1958 project. However, numerous canals draining the rural area south of Liaozhong between Liao River and Hun River had been rerouted to feed the river, and it does pick up more canals and old tributaries downstream, and winds southwards (serving as a border between Panjin's Panshan County and Anshan's Tai'an County) before draining merely 1.5 kilometres (0.93 mi) west of the confluence of Hun River and Taizi River. This 1.5 km confluence segment of the three rivers is locally known as the Trident River.

=== Hun River ===
The Hun River (浑河, "muddy river"), historically also known as Little Liao River (小辽水) or Shen River (沈水), is formally the second largest tributary of Daliao River. Running 415 kilometres (258 mi) and draining a basin of 11,500 square kilometres (4,400 sq mi), the Hun River has numerous tributaries of its own, 31 of which has catchment area greater than 100 square kilometres (39 sq mi). The river got its current name from the fast flow speed and high sediment load, which leads to its muddy appearance.

It flows through the most populous area of Liaoning province, including the provincial capital and largest city Shenyang, as well as the 10th largest city Fushun. The Hun River's headwaters arise from the Qian Mountains, a branch of the Changbai Mountains, where the river is also called Nalu River (纳噜水) or Red River (红河), and flows into the 5,437 cubic kilometres (1,304 cu mi) Dahuofang Reservoir (大伙房水库), which supplies drinking water to the surrounding cities of Shenyang, Fushun, Liaoyang, Anshan, Panjin, Yingkou and Dalian. The river's middle section was also called Shen River, which gave name to the capital city Shenyang to its north, and the lower section is also called Clam River (蛤蜊河).

=== Taizi River ===
The Taizi River (太子河, "crown prince river"), historically also known as Yan River (衍水) or Liang River (梁水), is formally the third largest tributary of the Daliao River, running 413 kilometres (257 mi) and draining a basin of 13,900 square kilometres (5,400 sq mi). The river was named according to the legend that it was the last site of refuge for Crown Prince Dan of Yan, who fled to Liaodong to resist Qin conquest after the failed assassination attempt on the King of Qin.

Its headwaters arise from hill regions between Benxi and Fushun, and contains the famous Benxi Water Caves. Like its sister, Hun River, running parallel north of it, Taizi River flows through some of the most important agricultural and industrial regions of southeastern Liaoning, including the cities of Benxi, Anshan, and Liaoyang.

=== Other minor tributaries ===
These include Xinkai River (新开河, "newly opened river"), Hutou River (虎头河, "tiger head river"), and Laodong River (劳动河, "labour river").

== Citations ==
- Wang, Tianxiang; Liu, Yexin; Wang, Zixiong; Wang, Tianzi; Zhang, Zipeng; Cui, Runfa; Ma, Rongyue; Su, Guangyu (15 November 2025). "Spatial Distribution and Environmental Impacts of Soil Nitrogen and Phosphorus in the Downstream Daliao River Basin". Water. 17 (22): 3267. Bibcode:2025Water..17.3267W. doi:10.3390/w17223267.
- Wang, Ping; He, Mengchang; Lin, Chunye; Men, Bin; Liu, Ruimin; Quan, Xiangchun; Yang, Zhifeng (September 2009). "Phosphorus distribution in the estuarine sediments of the Daliao river, China". Estuarine, Coastal and Shelf Science. 84 (2): 247. Bibcode:2009ECSS...84..246W. doi:10.1016/j.ecss.2009.06.020.
