= Wang Jinze =

Chinese footballer

Wang Jinze 王进泽
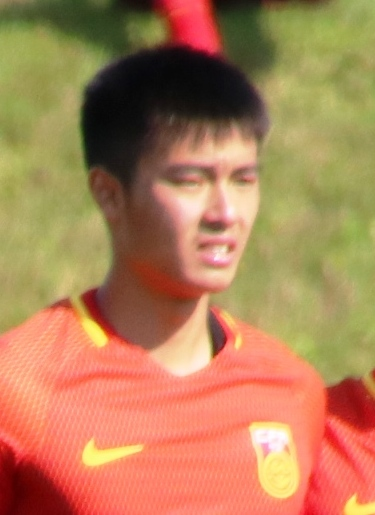

Personal information
- Date of birth: 15 March 1999 (age 27)
- Place of birth: Gaizhou, Liaoning, China
- Height: 1.89 m (6 ft 2 1/2 in)
- Position: Forward

Youth career
- Dalian Shide
- 2014–2017: Guangzhou Evergrande

Senior career*
Years	Team	Apps	(Gls)
2017–2020	Guangzhou Evergrande	1	(1)
2019	→ Inner Mongolia Zhongyou (loan)	10	(0)
2020	→ Shijiazhuang Ever Bright (loan)		
2021	Inner Mongolia Caoshangfei	10	(0)
2021–2022	Beijing BSU	46	(3)
2023	Shanghai Jiading Huilong	8	(0)
2023	→ Jiangxi Dark Horse Junior (loan)	8	(2)
2024	Jiangxi Dark Horse Junior	16	(2)
2025	Tai'an Tiankuang	8	(0)
2025	→ Wenzhou FC (loan)	8	(0)

International career^{‡}
2018	China U20	5	(1)
2018	China U23	3	(0)
- * Club domestic league appearances and goals as of 31 December 2020 ‡ National team caps and goals as of 14 October 2018

Wang Jinze (Chinese: 王进泽; pinyin: Wáng Jìnzé; Mandarin pronunciation: [wǎŋ tɕîn tsɤ̌]; born 15 March 1999) is a Chinese footballer.

== Club career ==
Wang Jinze was born in Xiongyue, Gaizhou (now part of Bayuquan District) and joined Dalian Dongbei Road Elementary School in 2005. He joined Chinese Super League side Guangzhou Evergrande's youth academy from Dalian Shide in 2014. He was then loaned to amateur team Zhuhai Suoka for the 2016 China Amateur Football League. Described as a potentially hot prospect for the future, Wang made a brief trial with Eredivisie side FC Groningen in early 2017.

Wang was promoted to Guangzhou Evergrande's first team squad in June 2017. He made his senior debut on 22 June 2017 in a 1–0 home win against Hebei China Fortune in the 2017 Chinese FA Cup, coming on as a substitute for Zhang Wenzhao in the 63rd minute. On 11 November 2018, Wang made his league debut in the last match of 2018 season against Tianjin TEDA, coming on for Alan Carvalho in the 82nd minute. He scored his first senior goal in the stoppage time, which ensured Guangzhou's 5–1 victory.

In February 2019, Wang was loaned to China League One side Inner Mongolia Zhongyou for the 2019 season.

== Career statistics ==
As of 31 December 2020.

Appearances and goals by club, season and competition
Club	Season	League			National Cup		Continental		Other		Total	
Club	Season	Division	Apps	Goals	Apps	Goals	Apps	Goals	Apps	Goals	Apps	Goals
Guangzhou Evergrande	2017	Chinese Super League	0	0	1	0	0	0	0 (Note: Appearances in Chinese FA Super Cup)	0	1	0
Guangzhou Evergrande	2018	Chinese Super League	1	1	0	0	0	0	0	0	1	1
Guangzhou Evergrande	Total		1	1	1	0	0	0	0	0	2	1
Inner Mongolia Zhongyou (loan)	2019	China League One	10	0	1	0	-		-		11	0
Shijiazhuang Ever Bright (loan)	2020	Chinese Super League	0	0	0	0	-		-		0	0
Career total			11	1	2	0	0	0	0	0	13	1
