= Xingcheng Haibin National Park =

National park in Liaoning, China

- 兴城海滨
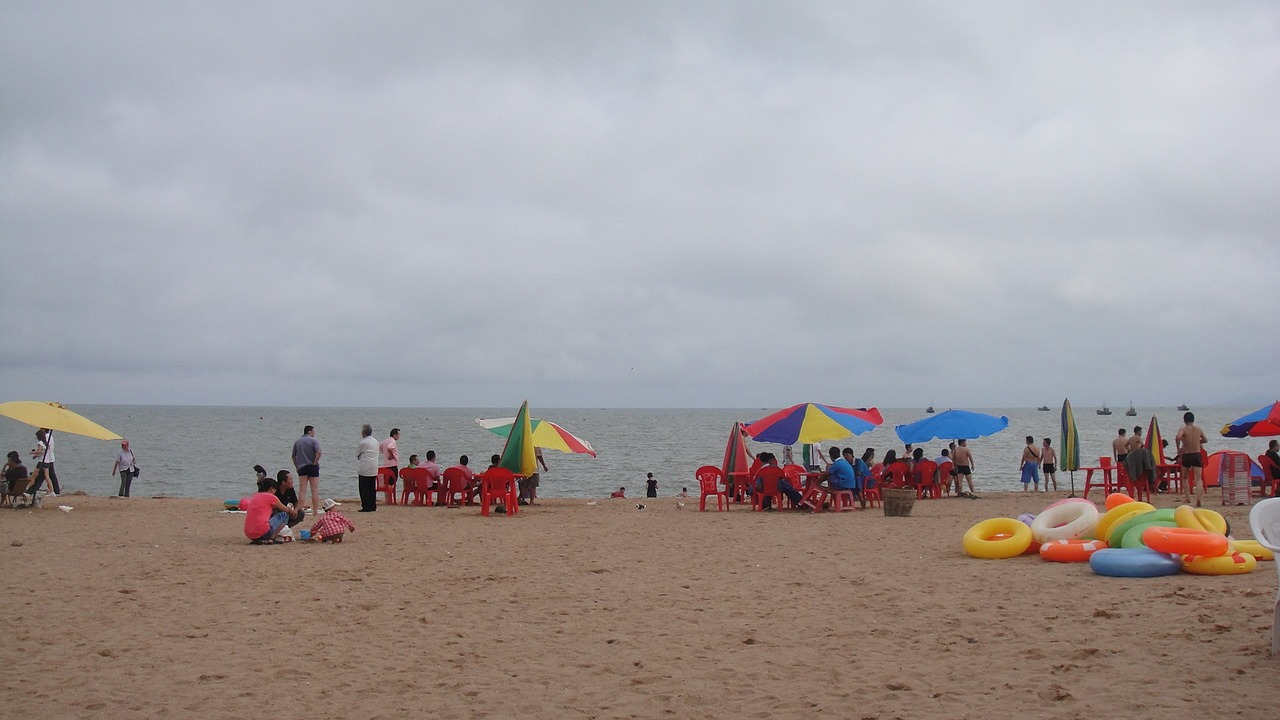
- Xingcheng Waterfront

- Location within China
- Location: Liaoning
- Nearest city: Xingcheng
- Coordinates: 40°40′0″N 120°50′0″E

Xingcheng Haibin National Park (Chinese: 兴城海滨; pinyin: Xīngchéng hǎibīn; lit. 'Prosperous City Waterfront') is a coastal national park in Liaoning Province, China. It is located south of the city center of Xingcheng, with an offshore island component, Juehua Island (simplified Chinese: 觉华岛; traditional Chinese: 覺華島; pinyin: Júehuá Dǎo; lit. 'Jue Hua Island'; 40°29′51″N 120°48′05″E), once a sanctuary for the Prince of Yan on the run from the ruthless Qin Shihuang. The park's name may also be translated as "Xingcheng Seaside Resort". The main beach is reachable by bus; Juhua Island is 9 km offshore, and is accessible by ferry. Although designated as a national park, Xingcheng Haibin is not listed as a "protected area" in the World Database of Protected Areas (WDPA).

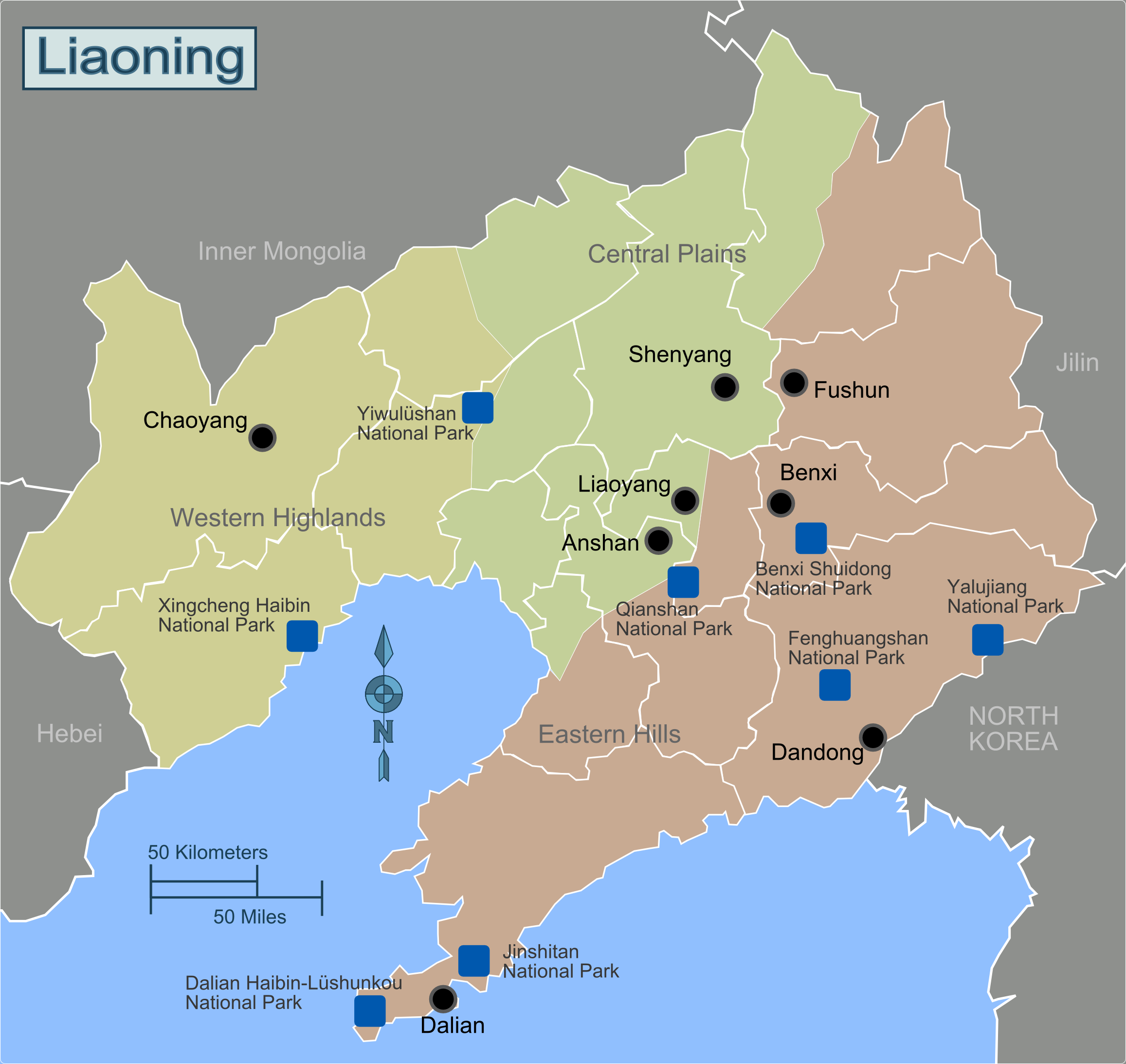
Xingcheng Haiban NP is located on the west side of Liaodong Bay, part of the Bohai Sea, in the southwest of Liaoning Province

Xingcheng, with Juehua Island offshore in Liaodong Bay
