= Usihada =

Qing dynasty military officer

Usihada (Manchu: ᡠᠰᡳᡥᠠᡩᠠ, romanized: Usihada; d. 1798), warrior title Fafuri Baturu (Manchu: ᡶᠠᡶᡠᡵᡳ
ᠪᠠᡨᡠᡵᡠ, "Diligent Warrior"), was a Qing military officer of the Irgen Gioro clan and a member of the Manchu Plain Yellow Banner.

== Biography ==
A native of Girin Ula and initially a member of the Banner's elite recon forces Gabsihiyan, Usihada participated in several major campaigns of the Qianlong era, including the Burmese campaigns, the Jinchuan campaigns, and the suppression of the Lin Shuangwen rebellion in Taiwan. His distinguished service in the Jinchuan campaigns earned him a hereditary rank and inclusion among the Fifty Meritorious Officials of the Pacification of Jinchuan (平定金川五十功臣), whose portraits were displayed in the Ziguangge Hall (紫光閣) of the Forbidden City.

During the Taiwan campaign of 1787–1788, he played a key role in reopening strategic routes and capturing the rebel leader Zhuang Datian (莊大田). For this achievement, he was ranked first among the Later Thirty Meritorious Officials of the Pacification of Taiwan (平定台湾後三十功臣) and was again honored in the Ziguangge Hall. Qianlong emperor commended him highly with following words:

As a commander in the Jinchuan campaign, (Usihada) feared not precipitous heights. Though unfamiliar with naval warfare, he capably led naval troops, surrounding the enemy with a fleet of warships and capturing the rebel leader (Zhuang) Datian. Firm in resolve, he won lasting merit through his achievements.

Usihada later served as Banner commanders of Jilin, Qiqihar, and Xiongyue, as well as Deputy Commander of the Bordered Red Mongol Banner. After being dismissed for submitting inaccurate military reports, he was exiled to Ili but subsequently restored to service. During the White Lotus Rebellion, he fought in Hubei and Sichuan against insurgent forces. In 1798, he was killed in action while resisting the rebel leader Wang Sanhuai (王三槐) despite being heavily outnumbered. He was posthumously granted the hereditary noble rank of adaha hafan.
