= Liaodong Peninsula =

Peninsula in Liaoning, China

Native name: 辽东半岛
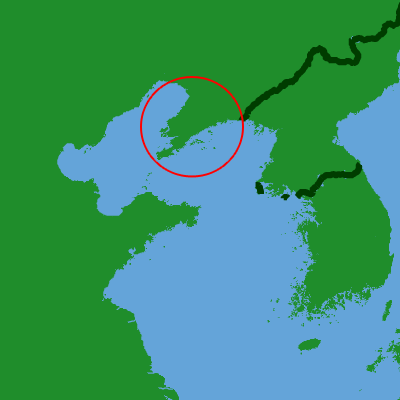
- Location of Liaodong Peninsula

- Location within China

Geography
- Coordinates: 40°00′N 122°30′E

Administration
- China
- Province: Liaoning

The Liaodong or Liaotung Peninsula (simplified Chinese: 辽东半岛; traditional Chinese: 遼東半島; pinyin: Liáodōng Bàndǎo) is a peninsula in southern Liaoning province in Northeast China, and makes up the southwestern coastal half of the Liaodong region. It is located between the mouths of the Daliao River (the historical lower section of the Liao River) in the west and the Yalu River in the east, and encompasses the territories of the whole sub-provincial city of Dalian and parts of prefectural cities of Yingkou, Anshan and Dandong.

The word "Liaodong" literally means "Liao region's east", referring initially to the Warring States period Yan commandery of Liaodong, which encompassed an area from modern Liaoning-Jilin border in the north to the Chongchon River on the Korean Peninsula in the south, and from just east of the Qian Mountains to a now-disappeared large wetland between the western banks of middle Liao River and the base of Yiwulü Mountain, historically known as the "Liao Mire" (遼澤, Liáo zé) roughly in between the modern Xinmin, Liaozhong, Tai'an, Panshan and Beizhen). The modern usage of "Liaodong", however, simply refers to the half of Liaoning province to the left/east bank of the Liao/Daliao River.

== Geography ==
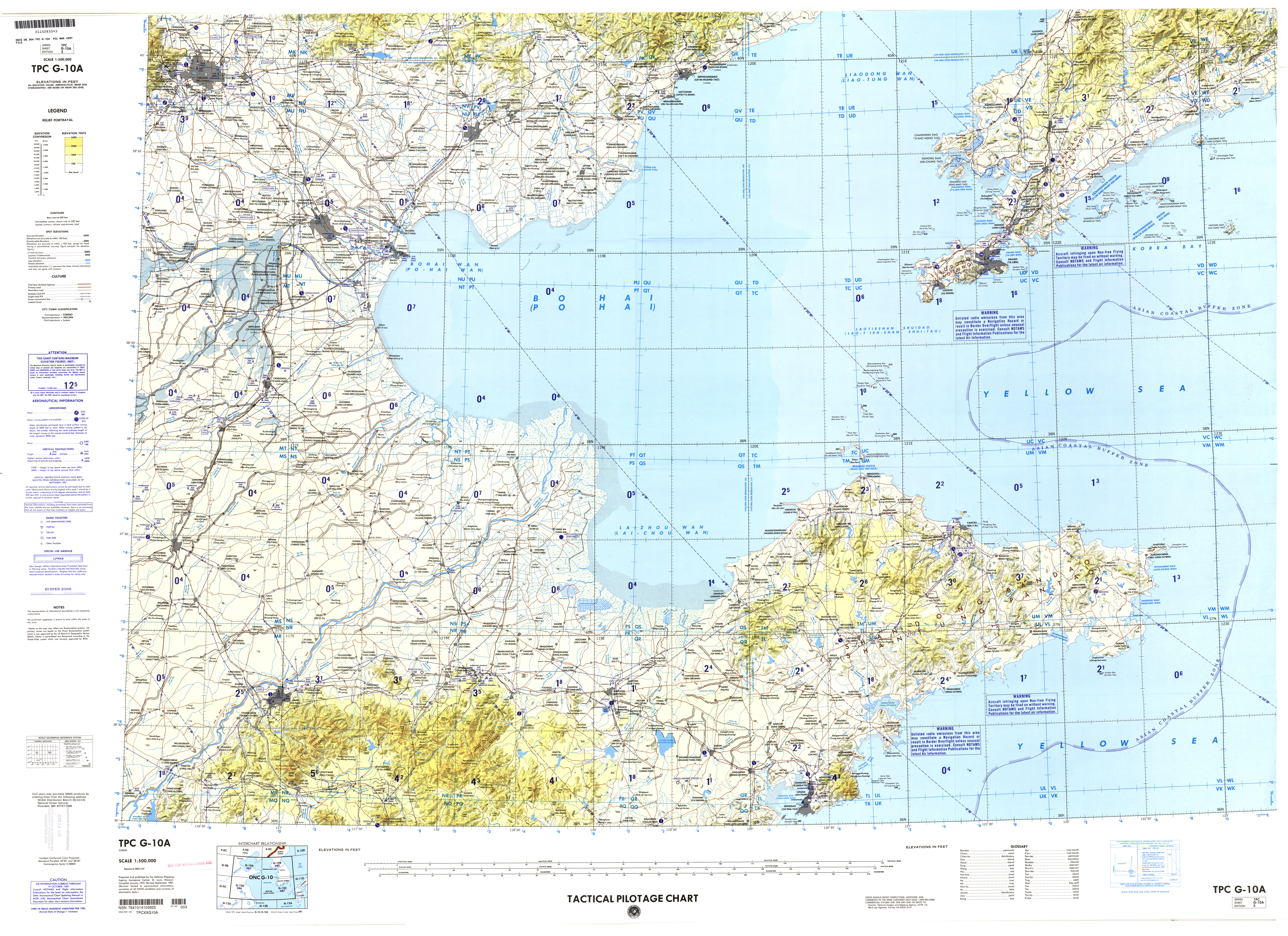
Map including the Liaodong Peninsula

The Liaodong Peninsula lies on the northern shore of the Yellow Sea, dividing the Liaodong Bay (the largest of the three bays of the Bohai Sea) to its west from the Korea Bay to its east. It forms the southern part of a mountain belt that continues northward in the Changbai Mountains. The part of the mountain range on the peninsula is known as the Qianshan Mountains, named after Qian Mountain in Anshan, which includes Dahei Mountain in Dalian.

== History ==
=== Pre-Han ===
The Liaodong region was settled since prehistoric times by Neolithic people such as Xinle culture. It later came under the rule of the Gojoseon kingdom, which encompassed the northern Korean Peninsula and the region southeast of the Liao River. In the late 4th century BC, the expanding Chinese State of Yan conquered this region from Gojoseon, and established the Liaodong Commandery.

=== Han to Qing ===
After the fall of the Yan state, the region was taken over by the short-lived Qin dynasty, and then its prominent successor Han dynasty. After the Han dynasty fragmented at the turn of the 3rd century, the region changed hands between various warlord states such as the Gongsun clan, the nomadic Wuhuan tribe, and finally Cao Wei, before eventually falling under the reunified Western Jin dynasty.

However, after the Western Jin fell from the Uprising of the Five Barbarians and during the subsequent chaotic Sixteen Kingdoms periods, the region was ruled by Former Yan, Former Qin, Later Yan and later Goguryeo, before being reconquered by the Tang dynasty.

In 698 AD, Wu Zhou's defeat at the Battle of Tianmenling allowed the newly founded Balhae to rule the region for the next two centuries, before they were supplanted by the Khitan Liao dynasty, and followed by the Jin dynasty, Yuan dynasty, Ming dynasty and Qing dynasty.

Liaodong was the primary destination of Shandong and Hebei refugees from the Northern Chinese Famine of 1876–1879. A prior Qing prohibition on immigration to Northeast China was officially relaxed, marking the start of Chuang Guandong. In 1876, Chinese officials told the Customs commissioner at Yingkou that 600,000 people had landed on the Liaodong Peninsula. Government efforts to keep Manchu heartlands free of Chinese settlement resulted in a concentration of refugees in Liaodong.

=== 19th and 20th century ===
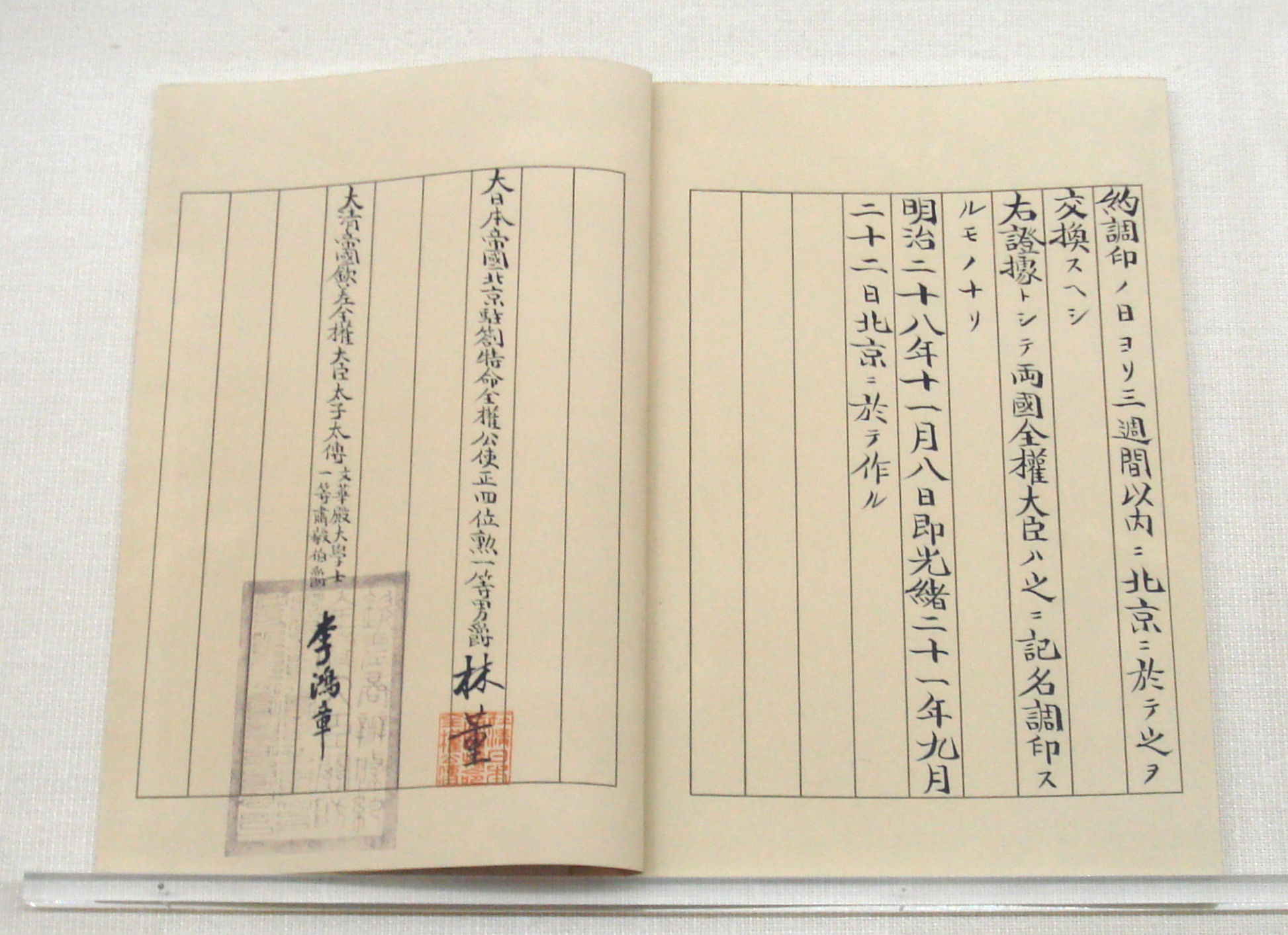
Convention of retrocession of the Liaotung Peninsula, 8 November 1895.

The peninsula was an important area of conflict during the First Sino-Japanese War (1894–1895). Defeat precipitated decline in the Qing dynasty which was exploited by colonial powers who extracted numerous concessions, through treaties such as the Li–Lobanov Treaty and the Convention for the Lease of the Liaotung Peninsula. The peninsula was ceded to Japan, along with Taiwan and Penghu, by the Treaty of Shimonoseki of 17 April 1895. However the ceding of Liaodong peninsula was rescinded after the Triple Intervention of 23 April 1895 by Russia, France and Germany. In the aftermath of this intervention, the Russian government pressured the Qing dynasty to lease Liaodong and the strategically important Lüshunkou (Port Arthur) for use by the Russian Navy.

As in the First Sino-Japanese War, the Liaodong peninsula was the scene of major fighting in the Russo-Japanese War (1904–1905), including the bloody Siege of Port Arthur. As a consequence of the Treaty of Portsmouth (5 September 1905), which ended the Russo-Japanese War, both sides agreed to evacuate Manchuria and return it to China, with the exception of the Liaodong Peninsula leased territory which was transferred to Japan, which was to administer it as the Kwantung Leased Territory.

After Japan lost World War II, and the People's Republic of China was established in 1949, Liaodong was again under unified Chinese rule, where it has been to this day.

== See also ==
- Chinese Eastern Railway
- Shandong Peninsula
