= Guanyinge Reservoir =

Large reservoir on the Taizi River in China

Guanyinge Reservoir 观音阁水库
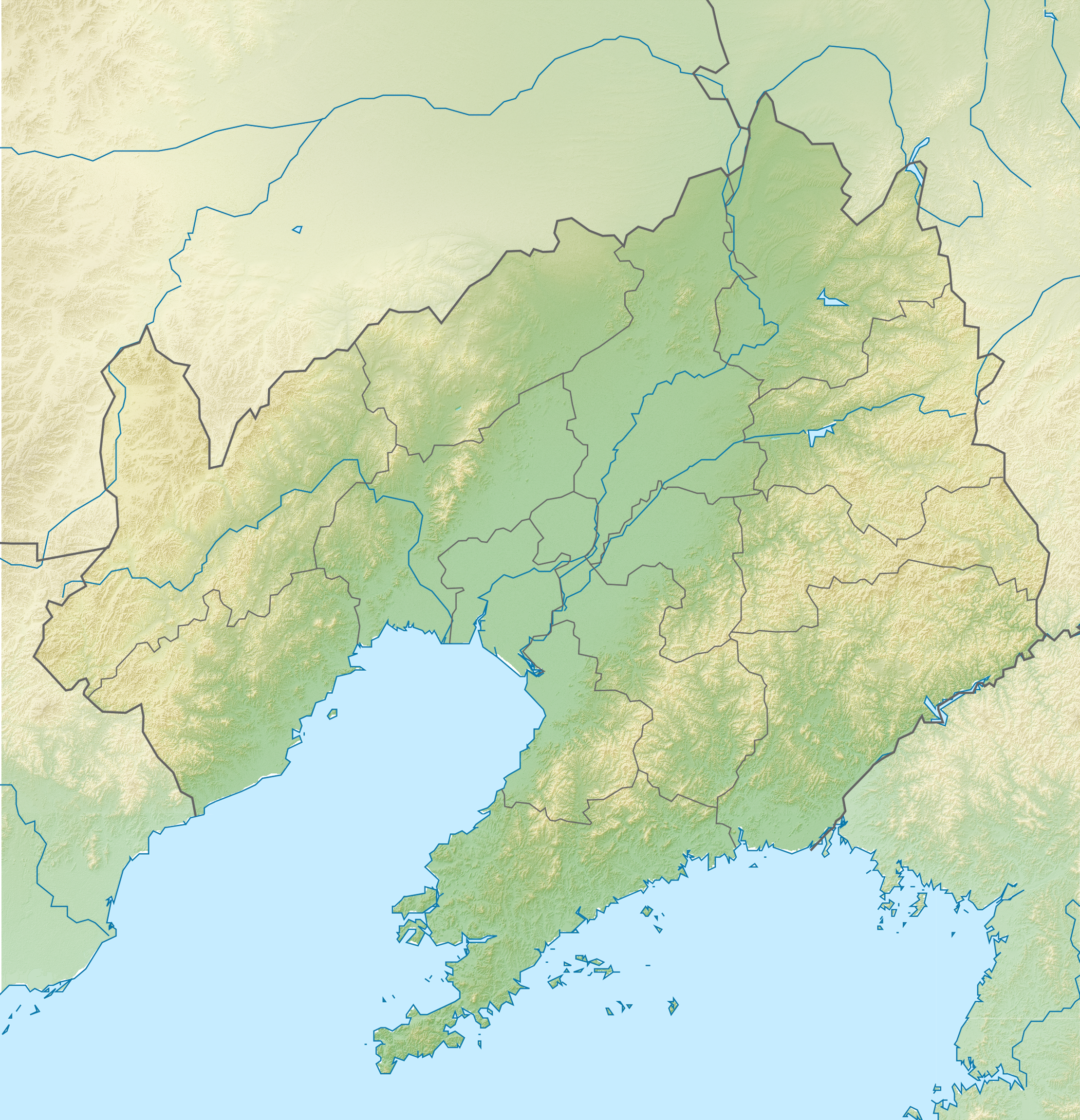
- Location within Liaoning Location within China
- Location: on the Taizi River
- Coordinates: 41°22′41″N 124°16′16″E
- Type: Reservoir
- Basin countries: China
- Built: May 1990

Guanyinge Reservoir (Chinese: 观音阁水库) is a large reservoir located on the main stream of the Taizi River in Benxi County, Liaoning province, China. Its water surface is 62 square kilometers, with a total storage capacity of 2.2 billion cubic meters.

Guanyinge Reservoir is a Sino-Japanese cooperation project and a key project of the province and the Chinese Ministry of Water Resources. With a total investment of 1.568 billion yuan, of which 11.78 billion is in Japanese yen.

The main part of the reservoir was begun in May 1990 and completed in September 1995.
