= Hun River (Liao River tributary) =

Tributary of the Liao river

Coordinates: 41.0142°N 122.4364°E

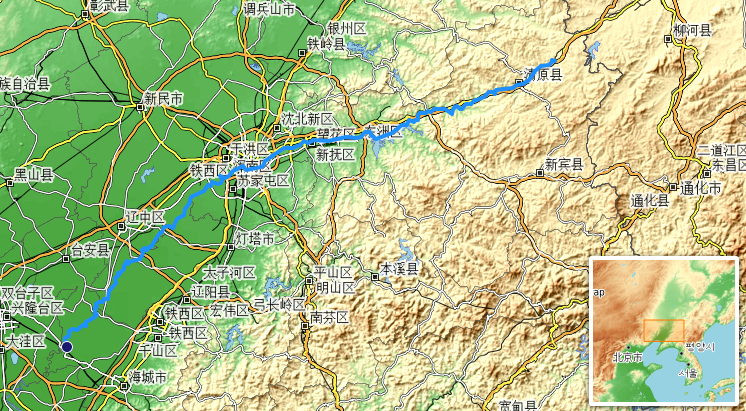
- Path of the Hun River
- Native name: ᡥᡠᠨᡝᡥᡝᠪᡳᡵᠠ (Manchu); hunehe bira (Manchu)

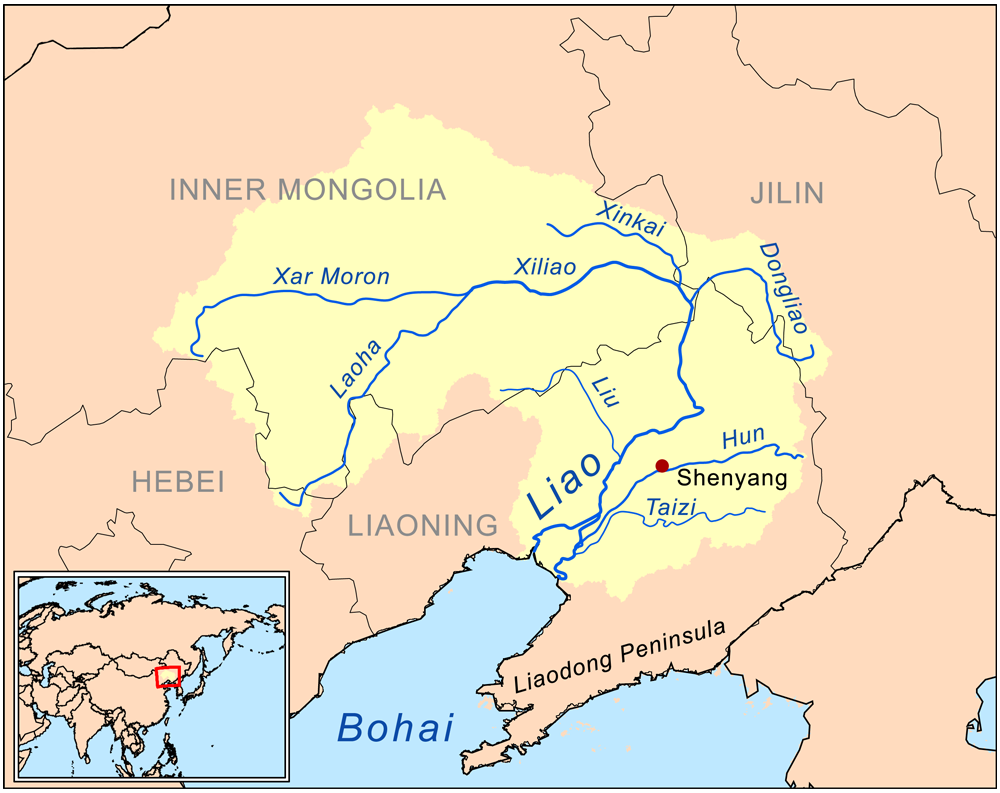
Location of the Hun River in China in the Liao watershed

The Hun River (渾河, "the muddy river") is a river in Liaoning Province, China, and was formerly one of the largest tributaries of the Liao River. It was also formerly known as Shen River (瀋水). Running 415 km (258 mi) and draining a basin of 11,500 km^{2} (4,400 mi^{2}), the Hun River has numerous tributaries, 31 of which have catchment areas greater than 100 square kilometres (39 mi^{2}). It flows through the most populous area of Liaoning Province, and two of Liaoning's most important cities, the provincial capital Shenyang and the seventh largest city Fushun, are located along the Hun River.

== Name ==
The name Hun River (渾河) means "the muddy/turbid river". This name comes from the Hun's fast flow speed and high sediment load, which leads to its muddy appearance.

Historically the Hun River was also known as Little Liao River (小辽水). The river's middle section was also formerly known as the Shen River (瀋水). The capital city Shenyang, located on the north of this middle section, was namesaked as it is on the north or "yang" side of the river. The lower section is also known as the Clam River (蛤蜊河).

== Geography ==
The Hun River's headwaters arise from the Qian Mountains, the western branch of the Changbai Mountains, where the river is also called Nalu River (纳噜水) or Red River (红河), and flows into the 5,437 cubic kilometres (1,304 cubic miles) Dahuofang Reservoir (大伙房水库), which supplies drinking water to the surrounding cities of Shenyang, Fushun, Liaoyang, Anshan, Panjin, Yingkou, and Dalian.

Until 1958, the Hun River joined the Taizi River and the Wailiao River (then the left and main distributary of the Liao River) near Haicheng. Together, they formed the Daliao River, which drains into the Liaodong Bay at Yingkou. The confluence of the three rivers was known as the "Trident River".

In 1958, a river engineering project was conducted to address flood control problem in the coastal area near Yingkou. The upper reaches of the Wailiao River at Liujianfang Village was blocked off, diverting the Liao River entirely towards the Shuangtaizi River. This effectively separated the Hun and Taizi rivers from the main body of Liao River system. Since 1958 the Hun and Taizi rivers are considered an independent river system of their own, and are no longer part of the Liao River system.
