= Bayuquan District =

Bayuquan 鲅鱼圈区
- District
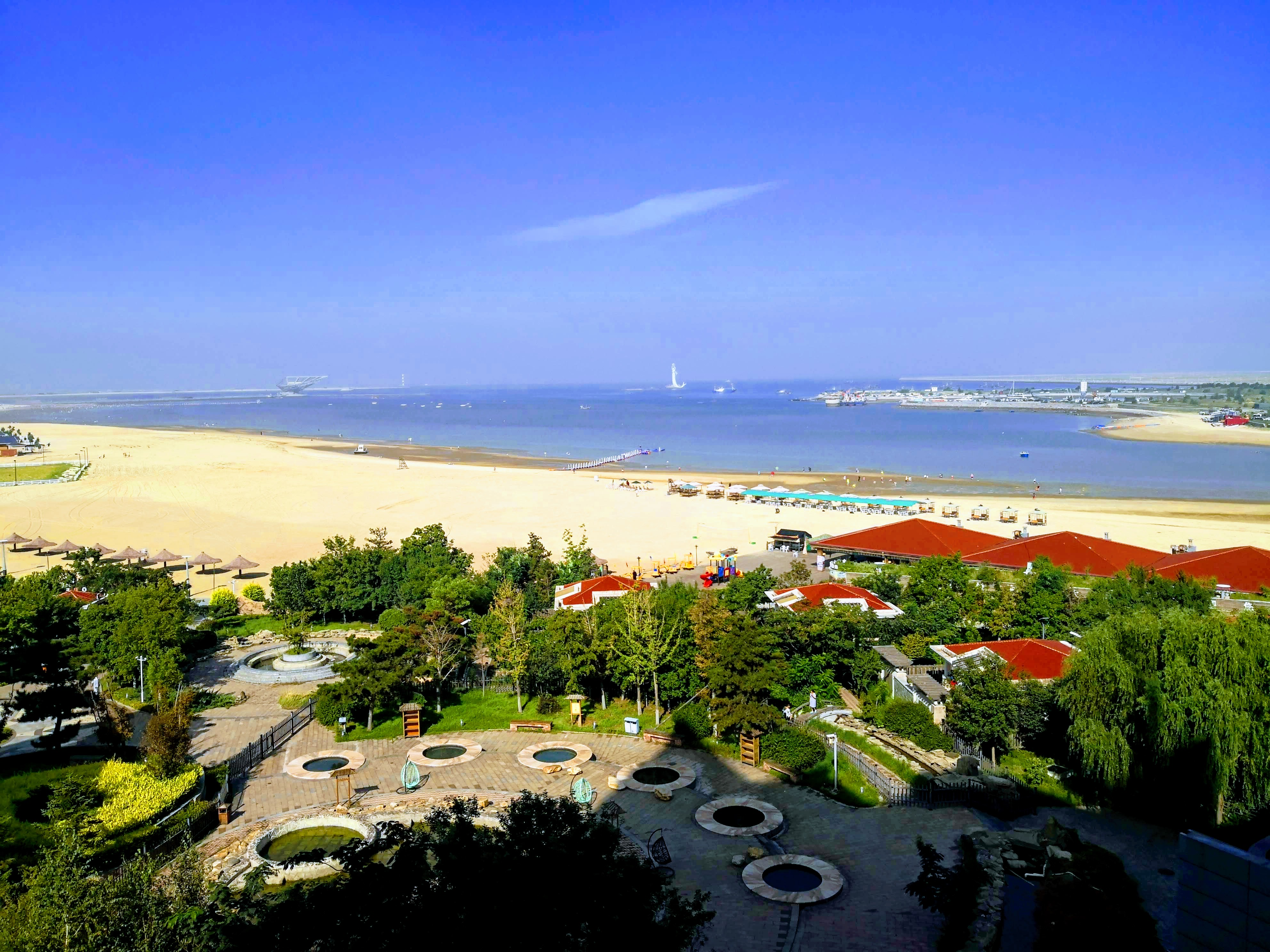

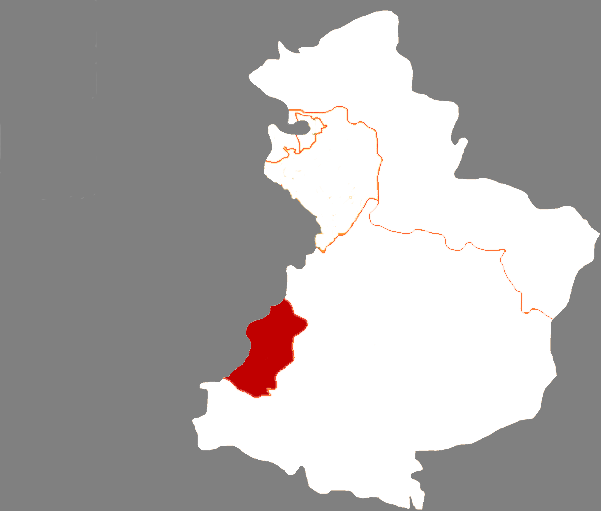
- Location in Yingkou

- Location in Liaoning
- Coordinates: 40°15′49″N 122°07′46″E
- Country: People's Republic of China
- Province: Liaoning
- Prefecture-level city: Yingkou

Area
  - Total: 352.9 km^{2} (136.3 sq mi)

Population (2020 census)
  - Total: 541,113
  - Density: 1,533/km^{2} (3,971/sq mi)
- Time zone: UTC+8 (China Standard)

Bayuquan District (simplified Chinese: 鲅鱼圈区; traditional Chinese: 鮁魚圈區; pinyin: Bàyúquān Qū) is a district of the city of Yingkou, Liaoning province, People's Republic of China. Located on the northeast coast of the Bohai Sea and in the northwest part of the Liaodong Peninsula, it is 46 kilometres (29 mi) south-southwest of Yingkou city centre. This small city is known for its seafood like fish and crabs which are shipped to all parts of the world. This District is also a tourism spot in the summer.

Bayuquan is also the site of a large sea port for bulk carriers and container ships, administered along with the port of Yingkou, the latter lying to the north of Bayuquan new port.

== Toponym ==
The literal translation of the toponym is "Japanese Spanish mackerel arc". The local fishermen began to fish here since the early Qing dynasty, as the coast shaped like an arc and the coastal waters are rich in Japanese Spanish mackerel ("bayu" in Chinese), thus, the area is named after "Bayuquan".

== Pollution ==
In recent years, air pollution and smog has posed challenges for district's tourism industry.

== Administrative divisions ==
There are four subdistricts and three towns within the district.

Subdistricts:

- Honghai Subdistrict (红海街道)
- Haixing Subdistrict (海星街道)
- Wanghai Subdistrict (望海街道)
- Haidong Subdistrict (海东街道)

Towns:

- Xiongyue (熊岳镇)
- Lutun (芦屯镇)
- Hongqi (红旗镇)

== Climate ==
Climate data for Bayuquan, elevation 20 m (66 ft), (1991–2020 normals, extremes 1991–present)
Month	Jan	Feb	Mar	Apr	May	Jun	Jul	Aug	Sep	Oct	Nov	Dec	Year
Record high °C (°F)	10.1 (50.2)	17.0 (62.6)	23.0 (73.4)	29.4 (84.9)	35.8 (96.4)	36.3 (97.3)	36.9 (98.4)	36.9 (98.4)	33.1 (91.6)	28.4 (83.1)	21.2 (70.2)	13.6 (56.5)	36.9 (98.4)
Mean daily maximum °C (°F)	−2.1 (28.2)	1.9 (35.4)	8.6 (47.5)	17.1 (62.8)	23.5 (74.3)	27.2 (81.0)	29.4 (84.9)	29.0 (84.2)	25.0 (77.0)	17.5 (63.5)	8.2 (46.8)	0.6 (33.1)	15.5 (59.9)
Daily mean °C (°F)	−8.3 (17.1)	−4.0 (24.8)	2.9 (37.2)	11.3 (52.3)	17.8 (64.0)	22.1 (71.8)	25.0 (77.0)	24.2 (75.6)	18.8 (65.8)	11.2 (52.2)	2.6 (36.7)	−5.0 (23.0)	9.9 (49.8)
Mean daily minimum °C (°F)	−13.9 (7.0)	−9.5 (14.9)	−2.4 (27.7)	5.7 (42.3)	12.0 (53.6)	17.1 (62.8)	21.0 (69.8)	19.9 (67.8)	13.1 (55.6)	5.1 (41.2)	−2.8 (27.0)	−10.3 (13.5)	4.6 (40.3)
Record low °C (°F)	−31.6 (−24.9)	−23.6 (−10.5)	−15.1 (4.8)	−7.7 (18.1)	1.0 (33.8)	6.5 (43.7)	13.1 (55.6)	7.0 (44.6)	1.0 (33.8)	−8.0 (17.6)	−19.6 (−3.3)	−26.2 (−15.2)	−31.6 (−24.9)
Average precipitation mm (inches)	4.0 (0.16)	7.0 (0.28)	10.6 (0.42)	34.5 (1.36)	52.9 (2.08)	72.2 (2.84)	123.8 (4.87)	161.3 (6.35)	52.0 (2.05)	38.1 (1.50)	20.9 (0.82)	7.5 (0.30)	584.8 (23.03)
Average precipitation days (≥ 0.1 mm)	3.2	2.8	3.6	6.0	7.4	9.2	10.4	10.0	6.0	6.2	4.9	3.4	73.1
Average snowy days	4.4	3.4	2.7	0.7	0	0	0	0	0	0.2	3.0	4.3	18.7
Average relative humidity (%)	63	58	54	53	57	69	79	82	75	69	65	64	66
Mean monthly sunshine hours	203.7	202.2	246.6	251.8	278.8	247.7	223.1	228.8	243.6	224.9	182.2	182.7	2,716.1
Percentage possible sunshine	68	67	66	63	62	55	49	54	66	66	62	63	62
Source: China Meteorological Administrationall-time extreme and July and August temperature
