= Bijia Mountain =

Island in Liaodong Bay, Bohai Sea, China

Coordinates: 40°48′37″N 121°04′35″E

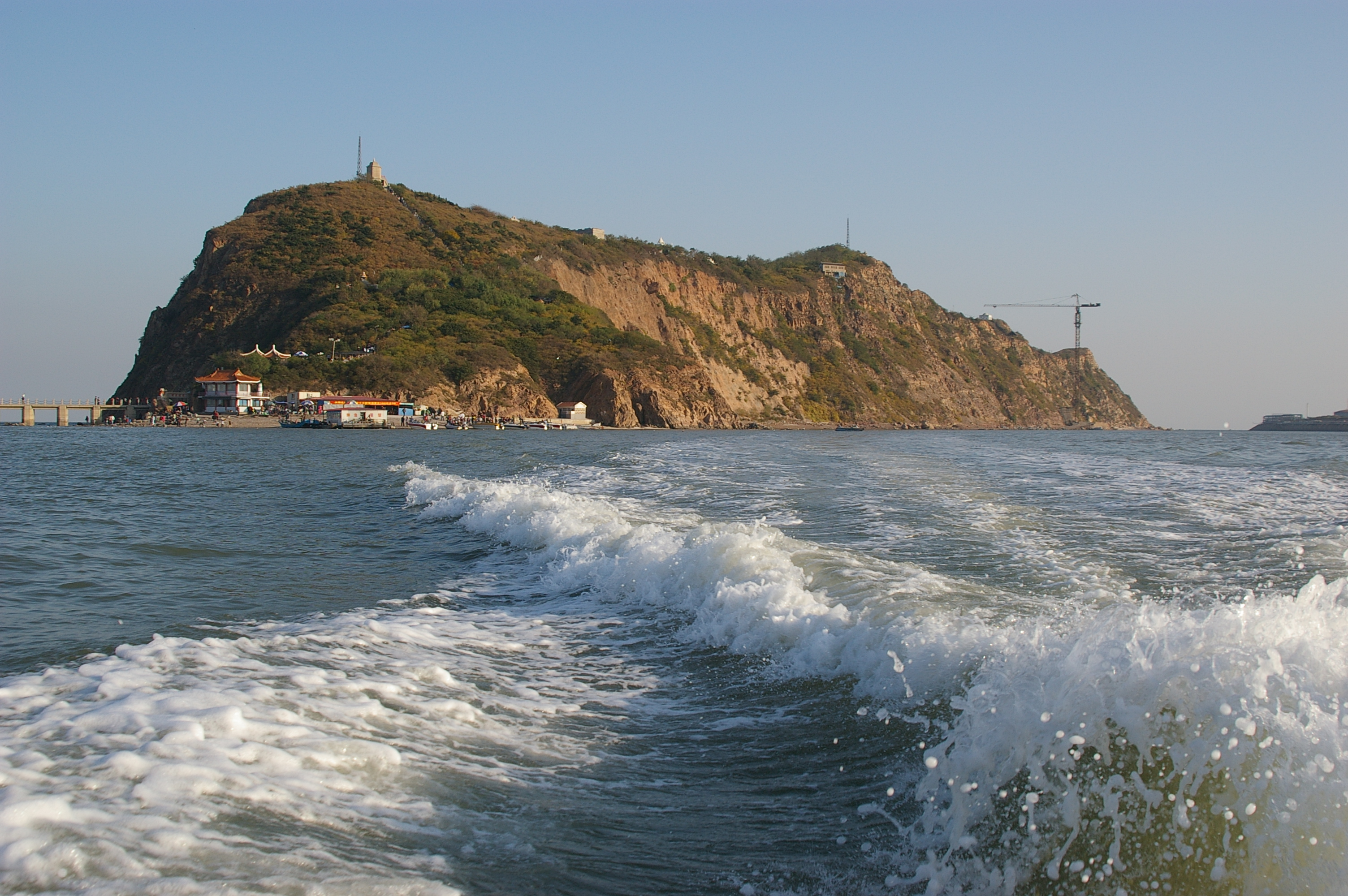
Bijia Mountain at high tide

Bijia Mountain (Chinese: 笔架山; pinyin: bǐjiàshān) is an island located in the Liaodong Bay of China's Bohai Sea, south of the coast of the Jinzhou region of the Liaoning province, coastal China. During most times of the day, Bijiashan can only be accessed by boat. But when the sea recedes, a natural zigzagging cobblestone causeway (a tombolo), over 10 metres wide, links the island to the mainland.

== Location ==
The island is located in the Jinzhou Economic and Technological Development Zone in Liaoning province, which is about 35 km from the city's downtown. It consists of the Bijia Mountain and the Celestial Bridge.

== Geography ==
The mountain is a small island facing the Bohai Sea with its peak of 78.3 meters and a total area of 1.2 square kilometers. The name is derived from its unique penholder shape. The northern side of the mountain faces the mainland and is relatively flat with paved winding stone steps for tourists’ climbing, while the southern side is secluded and contains fewer visitors. It is fraught with grotesque stones, deep clefts, and steep cliffs.

== Architecture ==
The mountain has many cultural relics and historic sites. It is said to be the place of the Pangu's Creation of the world and there are many pavilions and towers on it. Among them, the Sanqing Pavilion is one of the most distinctive buildings. It is well known for its complete stone structure. There are about 50 lifelike and vivid statues of the Buddha and Taoist and Confucian saints within the pavilion. On the top floor there is a shrine to the God of the Creation— Pan'gu. It is the only one of its kind in China.

== Transport ==
To access the island, an individual must either take a boat or wait for the sea to uncover the 1,620-metre-long (5,310 ft) bridge (also called Tiao Qiao in Chinese Pinyin) which links the island to the mainland. The bridge, which is actually a 9-meter-wide stone path, is formed by the tides and is higher than the beach.
