= Taizi River =

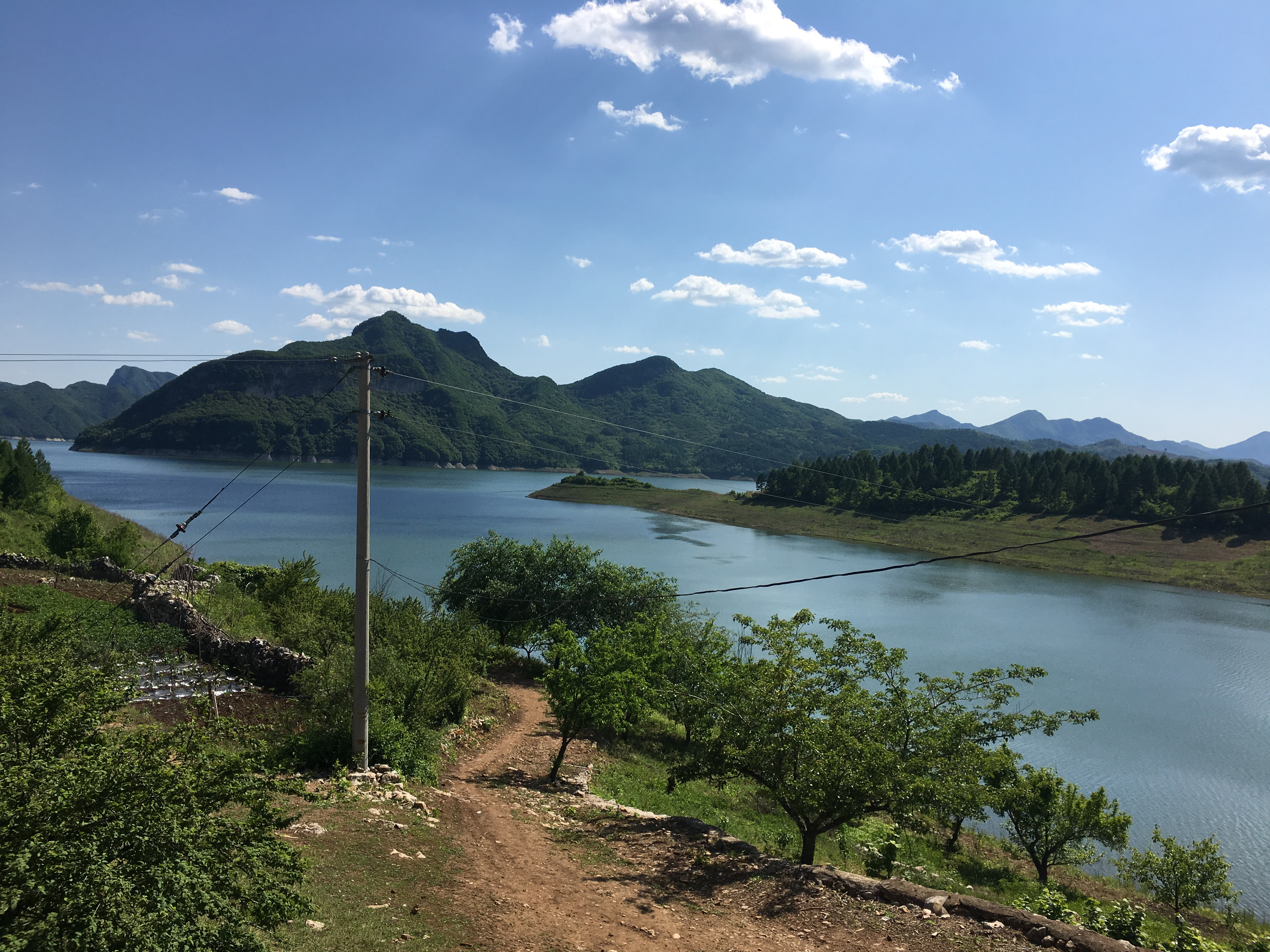

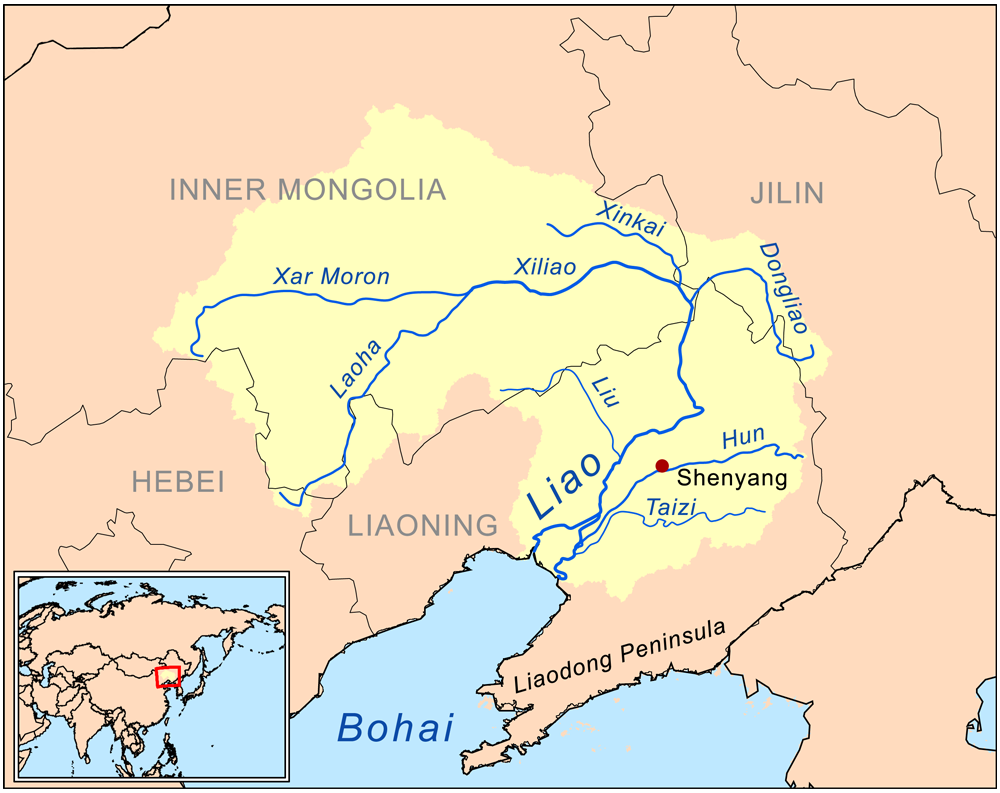
- Map showing Taizi River in the basin of Liao River
- Etymology: Prince River
- Native name: 太子河 (Chinese)

Location
- Country: China
- Region: Northeastern China
- Cities: Benxi, Liaoyang, Anshan, Yingkou

Physical characteristics
- Mouth: Liao River and Bohai Sea
  - location: Yingkou and Haicheng, China
- Length: 288.3 mi (464.0 km), North - South

Basin features
- River system: Liao River watershed

The Taizi River (Chinese: 太子河) is a major river in the Liaoning province of Northeastern China. The river was historically also known as Yan River (衍水) or Liang River (梁水). It was originally the third-largest tributary of the Liao River, southern Northeast's principal river, draining with the neighboring Hun River into a confluence known as "Trident River" near Haicheng, until a river engineering project in 1958 cut off the eastern distributary of the river delta from the Liao River's main course, making the Hun River and Taizi Rivers a separate system that drains into the Bohai Bay independently from the Liao River. However, both sister rivers are still usually considered a part of the Liao River system because they are both within the historical Liao River drainage basin.

== Name ==
The name Taizi literally means "crown prince". During the late Warring States period, Jing Ke, an assassin sent by Crown Prince Dan of Yan for a mission of killing King Zheng of Qin, failed in the attempt. The Qin state retaliated with a massive invasion to conquer the Yan state. After the Yan state fell, Crown Prince Dan fled far into the Liaodong region, and was eventually tracked down and slain by the pursuing Qin forces. According to the legend, the prince's last site of refuge was at the bank of this river, hence the name.

== Geography ==
The Taizi was formally the third-largest tributary of the Liao River. The river runs 413 kilometres (257 mi) and drains a basin of 13,900 square kilometres (5,400 sq mi). The Taizi River, like the Hun River running parallel north of it, flows through some of the most important agricultural and industrial regions of southern Liaoning, including the cities of Benxi, Anshan, and Liaoyang. Like its sister river, the Hun River, the Taizi River has numerous tributaries, including the two largest ones of which it is formed from the confluence.

The Taizi"s headwaters arise from hill regions between Benxi and Fushun, and contain the famous Benxi Water Caves. Like the Hun River, the Taizi River is no longer a tributary of the Liao River since the obliteration of the Wailiao River in 1958.
