= Yiwulü Mountain =

Mountain in Liaoning, China

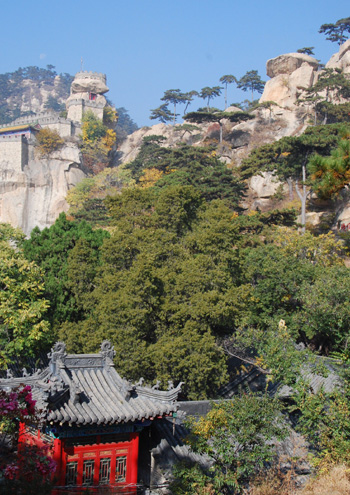
Yiwulü Mountain in Beizhen City of Jinzhou City, Liaoning, China

Yiwulü Mountain (Chinese: 医巫闾山) or simply Lü Mountain (Chinese: 闾山) is located in the western part of Beizhen City, in Jinzhou City, Liaoning Province. It is one of the Three Greatest Mountains of Northeast China, together with Qianshan and Mount Changbai.

Its highest peak is 867 meters above sea level. It is located about 5 kilometers west of the center of Beizhen County-level City, Jinzhou, Liaoning Province.

During the Song dynasty, it was one of the "chief mountains" (distinct from the Five Sacred Mountains) associated with sacrifices. It was considered sacred by the Liao and Jin.
