= Xiongyue =

Town in Liaoning, China

Xiongyue 熊岳镇 Hiungyue
- Town
- Location in Liaoning
- Coordinates: 40°10′43″N 122°07′46″E
- Country: People's Republic of China
- Province: Liaoning
- Prefecture-level city: Yingkou
- District: Bayuquan
- Time zone: UTC+8 (China Standard)
- Postal code: 115007

Xiongyue (Chinese: 熊岳; pinyin: Xióngyuè; Wade–Giles: Hsiungyueh), or Xiongyuecheng is a town in Bayuquan District, Yingkou, Liaoning, China, located on the eastern coast of Liaodong Bay. As of 2011, it has 5 residential communities (社区) and 14 villages under its administration.
