= Benxi Water Caves =

National park in Liaoning, China

Coordinates: 41°18′N 123°46′E

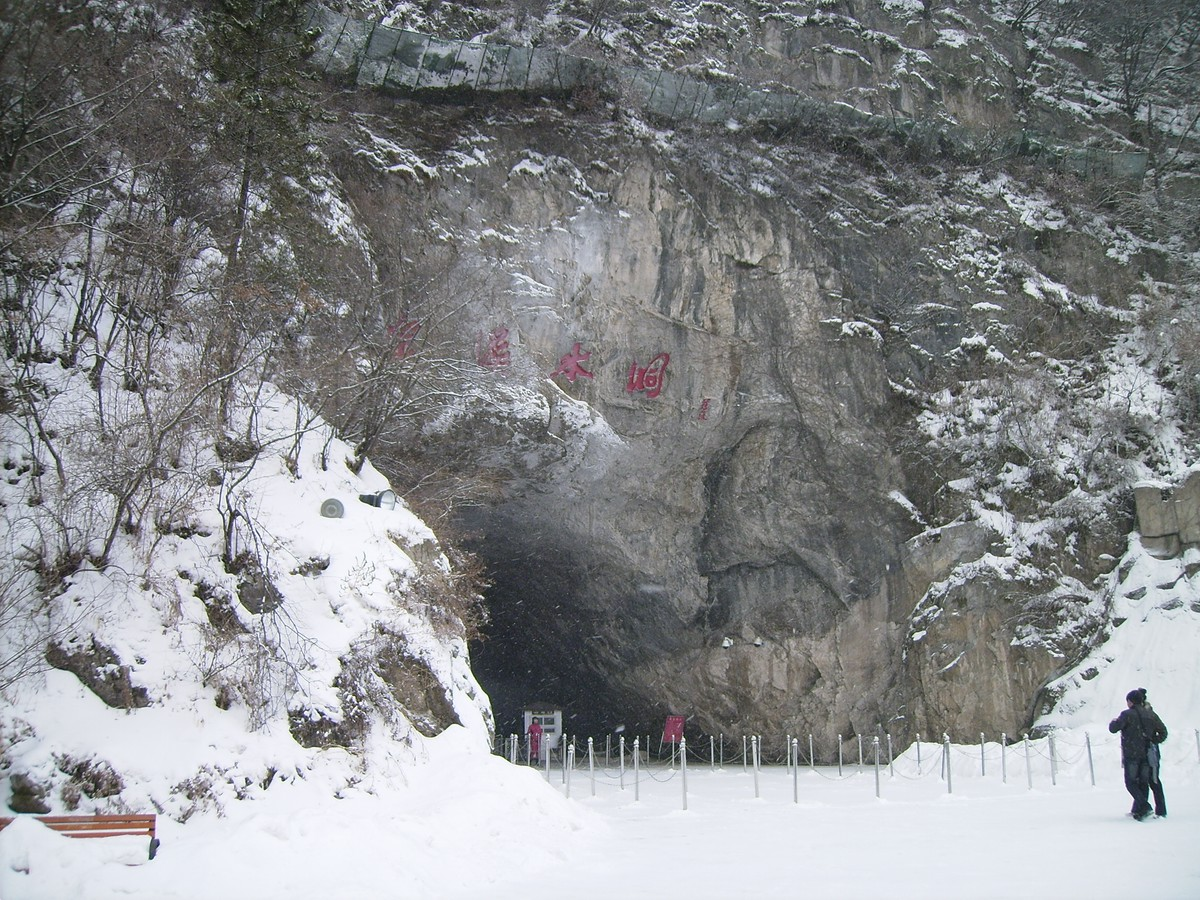
Entrance opening to the Benxi Water Caves

The Benxi Water Caves (Chinese: 本溪水洞; pinyin: Běnxī Shuǐdòng) is a partially submerged cavern system containing a forest of stalactites and stalagmites, located 26 kilometres (16 mi) east of Benxi, Liaoning Province, People's Republic of China. It was made a national park on January 10, 1994, and is open to the public all year round. It was designated an "AAAAA"-class tourist attraction by CNTA in 2015.

The giant 5-million-year-old cavern complex is lit by colored artificial lighting, and expands over 5,800 m (3.6 mi) with a maximal width of 70 m (230 ft), maximal ceiling height of 38 m (125 ft), an area of 36,000 m^{2} (8.9 acres) and a volume of over 400,000 m^{3} (520,000 cu yd). It has a subterranean river 3,000 m (1.9 mi) long, with an average depth of 1.5 m (4.9 ft) and maximal depth of 7 m (23 ft), and a daily discharge of 14,000 m^{3} (3,700,000 US gal). Currently 2,800 m (1.7 mi) of the cave has been developed for tourism, with a dock 300 m (330 yd) into the entrance and a 1,000 m^{2} (11,000 sq ft) docking bay large enough to park 40 boats. Temperature inside the cave is constant throughout the year, at around 12 °C (54 °F), though slightly warmer in summer than winter.

In addition to the water caves, the national park also offers tourist attractions such as trekking to the top of the mountain, Woodstone Kingdom, dinghy rafting on the Taizi River, and the geological museum which hosts many relics and rare specimens collected from the national park area.
