= Tai'an County =

Tai'an 台安县
- County
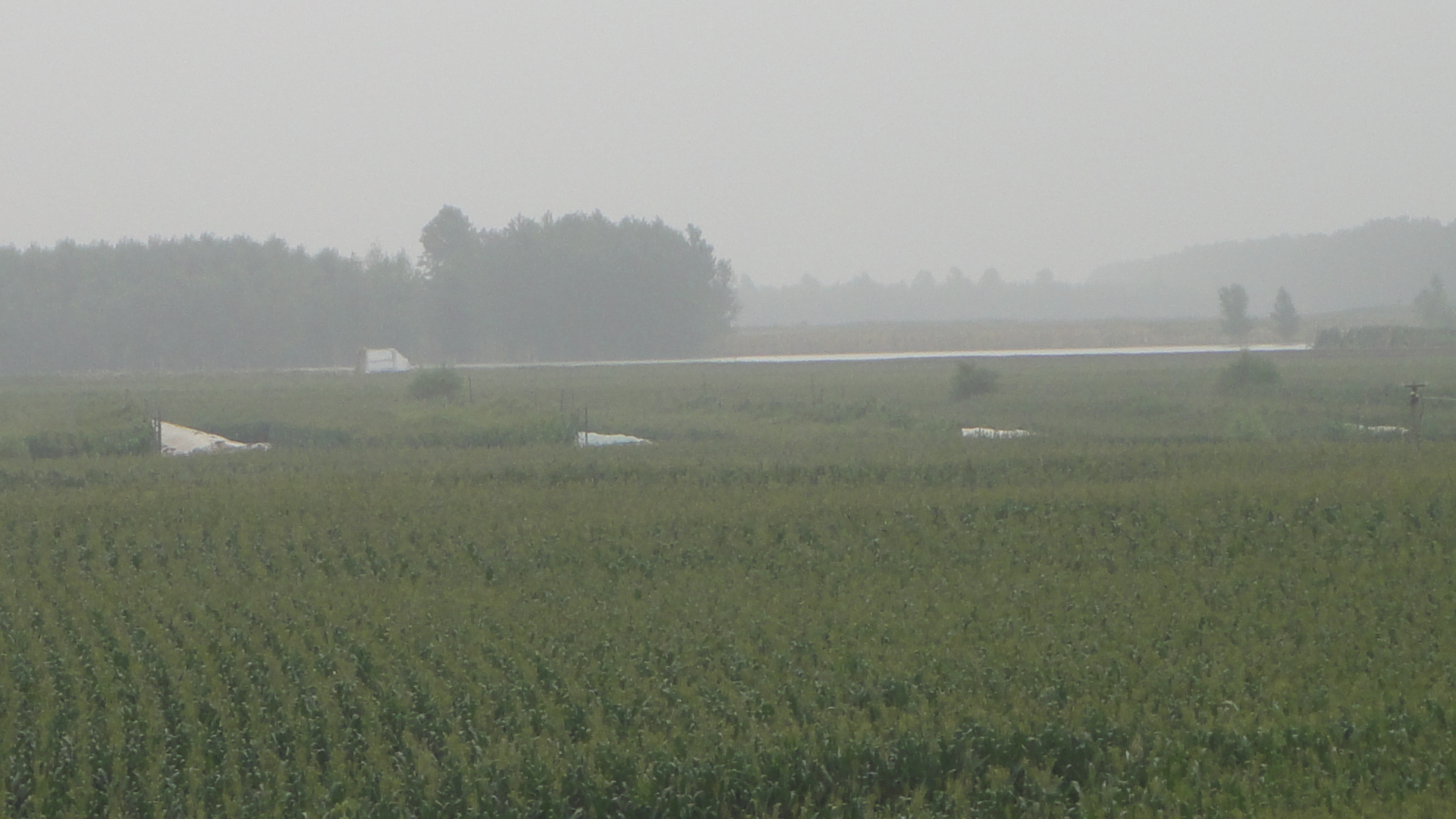

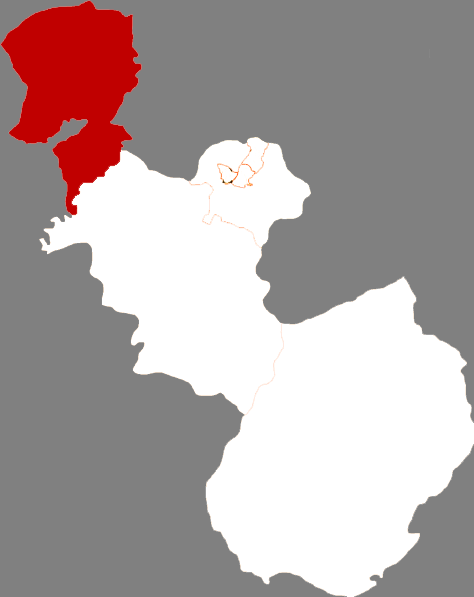
- Tai'an in Anshan

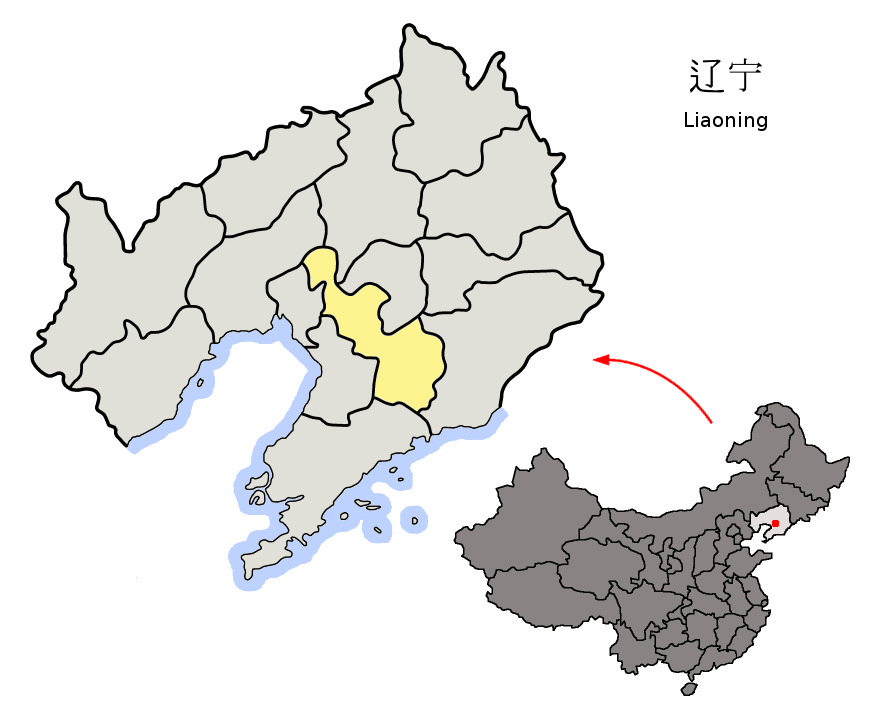
- Anshan in Liaoning
- Coordinates: 41°24′47″N 122°26′10″E
- Country: People's Republic of China
- Province: Liaoning
- Prefecture-level city: Anshan
- County seat: Tai'an Town (台安镇)

Area
  - Total: 1,393 km^{2} (538 sq mi)
- Elevation: 7 m (23 ft)

Population (2020 census)
  - Total: 300,764
  - Density: 215.9/km^{2} (559.2/sq mi)
- Time zone: UTC+8 (China Standard)
- Postal code: 114100

Tai'an (Chinese: 台安; pinyin: Tái'ān) is a county in the central part of Liaoning province, People's Republic of China. It is located in the northwest corner of the prefecture-level city of Anshan, and has a population of 300,764 (2020) residing in an area of 1,393 km^{2} (538 sq mi).

== Administrative divisions ==
There are 11 towns under the county's administration.

- Tai'an (台安镇)
- Gaolifang (高力房镇)
- Huangshatuo (黄沙坨镇)
- Xinkaihe (新开河镇)
- Sanglin (桑林镇)
- Jiucaitai (韭菜台镇)
- Xintai (新台镇)
- Fujia (富家镇)
- Huandong (桓洞镇)
- Xifo (西佛镇)
- Daniu (达牛镇)

== Climate ==
Climate data for Tai'an, elevation 8 m (26 ft), (1991–2020 normals, extremes 1981–2025)
| Month | Jan | Feb | Mar | Apr | May | Jun | Jul | Aug | Sep | Oct | Nov | Dec | Year |
|---|---|---|---|---|---|---|---|---|---|---|---|---|---|
| Record high °C (°F) | 7.4 (45.3) | 15.8 (60.4) | 26.5 (79.7) | 28.1 (82.6) | 32.3 (90.1) | 36.0 (96.8) | 35.5 (95.9) | 34.2 (93.6) | 32.2 (90.0) | 29.3 (84.7) | 20.3 (68.5) | 11.6 (52.9) | 36.0 (96.8) |
| Mean daily maximum °C (°F) | −3.6 (25.5) | 1.0 (33.8) | 7.9 (46.2) | 16.9 (62.4) | 23.7 (74.7) | 27.1 (80.8) | 29.2 (84.6) | 28.7 (83.7) | 24.7 (76.5) | 16.7 (62.1) | 6.4 (43.5) | −1.5 (29.3) | 14.8 (58.6) |
| Daily mean °C (°F) | −9.5 (14.9) | −4.9 (23.2) | 2.2 (36.0) | 10.8 (51.4) | 17.9 (64.2) | 22.3 (72.1) | 24.9 (76.8) | 24.0 (75.2) | 18.6 (65.5) | 10.7 (51.3) | 1.0 (33.8) | −7.0 (19.4) | 9.2 (48.6) |
| Mean daily minimum °C (°F) | −14.4 (6.1) | −10.0 (14.0) | −2.8 (27.0) | 5.1 (41.2) | 12.4 (54.3) | 17.7 (63.9) | 21.1 (70.0) | 20.0 (68.0) | 13.3 (55.9) | 5.4 (41.7) | −3.6 (25.5) | −11.6 (11.1) | 4.4 (39.9) |
| Record low °C (°F) | −30.1 (−22.2) | −25.6 (−14.1) | −16.2 (2.8) | −8.5 (16.7) | 0.2 (32.4) | 8.4 (47.1) | 14.3 (57.7) | 7.1 (44.8) | 1.5 (34.7) | −6.1 (21.0) | −21.2 (−6.2) | −27.4 (−17.3) | −30.1 (−22.2) |
| Average precipitation mm (inches) | 3.3 (0.13) | 4.8 (0.19) | 11.1 (0.44) | 30.8 (1.21) | 53.4 (2.10) | 74.4 (2.93) | 159.6 (6.28) | 136.0 (5.35) | 58.2 (2.29) | 41.2 (1.62) | 18.2 (0.72) | 5.9 (0.23) | 596.9 (23.49) |
| Average precipitation days (≥ 0.1 mm) | 1.9 | 2.1 | 3.3 | 5.4 | 8.2 | 11.2 | 10.4 | 9.5 | 6.5 | 5.4 | 4.0 | 2.6 | 70.5 |
| Average snowy days | 2.9 | 2.8 | 2.8 | 0.8 | 0 | 0 | 0 | 0 | 0 | 0.3 | 2.9 | 3.1 | 15.6 |
| Average relative humidity (%) | 57 | 52 | 51 | 51 | 57 | 71 | 81 | 81 | 72 | 65 | 62 | 60 | 63 |
| Mean monthly sunshine hours | 180.6 | 185.6 | 221.0 | 223.3 | 247.3 | 214.2 | 188.6 | 202.1 | 220.4 | 199.6 | 162.6 | 160.4 | 2,405.7 |
| Percentage possible sunshine | 61 | 61 | 59 | 56 | 55 | 47 | 41 | 48 | 60 | 59 | 56 | 56 | 55 |
Source: China Meteorological Administration October all-time Record
