= Liaodong Bay =

Bay of the Bohai Sea in northeastern China

Coordinates: 40.04°N 120.89°E

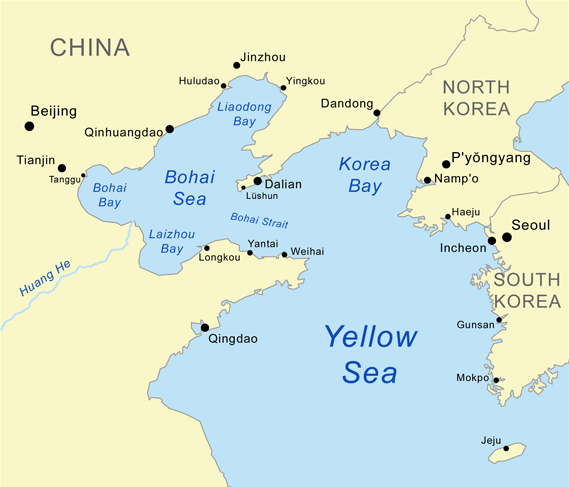
- Simplified Chinese: 辽东湾
- Traditional Chinese: 遼東灣
Transcriptions
Standard Mandarin
- Hanyu Pinyin: Liáodōng Wān

Liaodong Bay is largest and longest of the three main bays of the Bohai Sea, the innermost gulf of the Yellow Sea. The other two bays are Laizhou Bay to the south and Bohai Bay to the southwest.

Although named after the Liaodong Peninsula (which forms its eastern shore), the bay is located directly south of the Liaoxi region, almost entirely west of the Liao River. It is bounded by the coastline of cities from southern Liaoning province (Dalian, Yingkou, Panjin, Jinzhou and Huludao) and eastern Hebei province (Qinhuangdao and Tangshan), between the Laotieshan Cape at Dalian's Lüshunkou District in the east, and the Daqing River estuary (which is an old southern mouth of Luan River) at Tangshan's Laoting County in the west. The bay is a source of ecological importance and exhibits rich biodiversity.

The major rivers that drain into the Liaodong Bay include Luan River, Daling River, Xiaoling River, Liao River and Daliao River.

The bay can experience sea ice during the winter, posing difficulties for mariners.

== See also ==
- Geography of China
- Bijia Mountain, an island-mountain in the bay
