= Qian Mountains =

Mountain range in China

Coordinates: 40.5°N 123.333°E

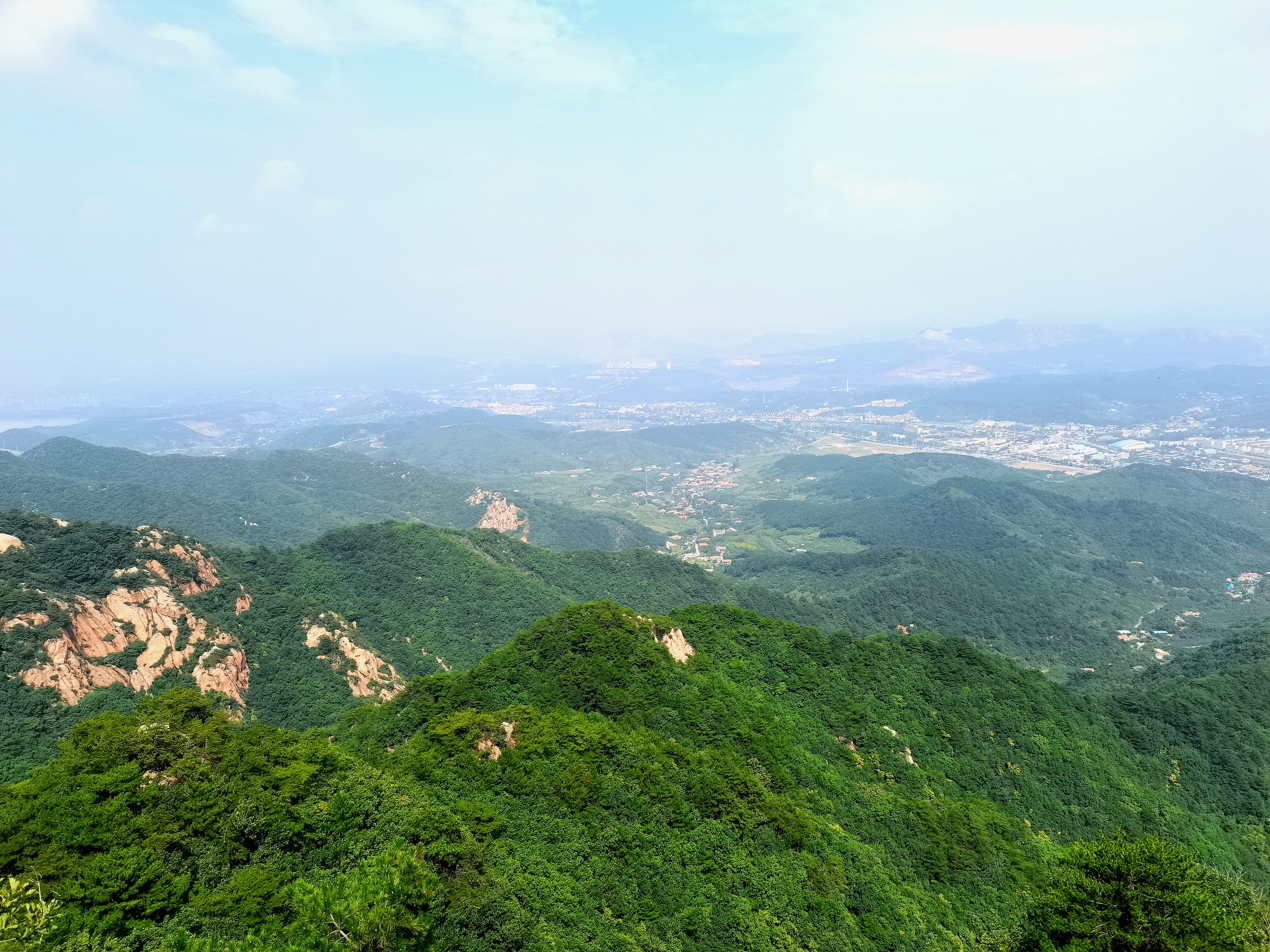
Qian Mountains

Qian Mountains or Qianshan (Chinese: 千山; pinyin: Qiān Shān), a branch of the Changbai Mountains on the China-North Korea border, start from eastern Jilin Province, China, and extend to eastern and southern Liaoning Province, down to Liaodong Peninsula.

Some of the prominent mountains are:

- Dahei Shan (Dalian)
- Huabo Shan (Benxi) - The highest peak (1,336 meters (4,383 ft))
- Laomao Shan (Dalian)
- Laotie Shan (Dalian)
- Qian Shan (Anshan)
- Wunv Shan (Benxi)

== See also ==
- Changbai Mountains
- Jilin Province
- Liaoning Province
