= Qianshan =

Qianshan is the atonal pinyin romanization of various Chinese placenames related to mountains or islands.

It may refer to:

- Qian Mountains (千山, Qiānshān), a northeastern mountain range
- Qianshan District (千山区, Qiānshānqū) in Anshan, Liaoning
- Qianshan County (潜山县, Qianshanxian), Anhui
- Yanshan County (铅山; Yánshān), Jiangxi (the characters in its name are usually pronounced as Qianshan in standard Mandarin)
- Qianshan (千山镇, Qianshanzhen), a town within Qianshan District, Anshan, Liaoning
- Qianshan (钤山镇, Qianshanzhen), a town in Fenyi County, Jiangxi
- Qianshan Subdistrict (前山街道, Qiánshān Jiēdào), a subdistrict (formerly a separate town) of Xiangzhou District, Zhuhai, Guangdong
- Qianshan National Park (千山国家公园, Qianshan Guojia Gongyuan) in Anshan, Liaoning
