= Tiedong District, Anshan =

Tiedong 铁东区
- District
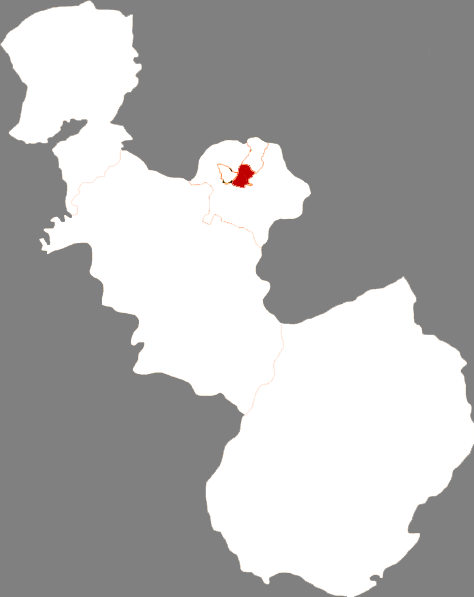
- Location in Anshan
- Coordinates: 41°05′33″N 122°59′39″E
- Country: China
- Province: Liaoning
- Prefecture-level city: Anshan
- District seat: Xinxing Subdistrict

Area
  - Total: 228 km^{2} (88 sq mi)

Population (2020 census)
  - Total: 511,574
  - Density: 2,240/km^{2} (5,810/sq mi)
- Time zone: UTC+8 (China Standard)
- Website: www.tiedong.gov.cn

Tiedong District (simplified Chinese: 铁东区; traditional Chinese: 鐵東區; pinyin: Tiědōng Qū) is a district of the city of Anshan, Liaoning province, People's Republic of China. It is the seat of Anshan's government and the main business and shopping district of the city.

Leishishan Park, Renmin Park, 219 Park and Dongshan Park, are located here. The Jade Buddha Palace, housing the world's largest statue of Buddha made from jade, is a major tourist attraction and located at the northeast of 219 Park. Anshan museum is located beside the temple.

== Administrative divisions ==
Tiedong District is divided into 10 subdistricts.

- Jiefang Subdistrict (解放街道)
- Shannan Subdistrict (山南街道)
- Yuanlin Subdistrict (园林街道)
- Zhanqian Subdistrict (站前街道)
- Heping Subdistrict (和平街道)
- Hunan Subdistrict (湖南街道)
- Xinxing Subdistrict (新兴街道)
- Jiubao Subdistrict (旧堡街道)
- Dagushan Subdistrict (大孤山街道)
- Changdian Subdistrict (长甸街道)

== Education ==
Tiedong district contains two universities: Anshan Normal University and Liaoning University of Science and Technology.

Elementary Schools

- Huayu Elementary School
- Lieshishan Elementary School
- Shengli Elementary School
- Gangdu Elementary School
- Shannan Elementary School
- Dongchangdian Elementary School
- 219 Elementary School
- Zhangda Elementary School
- Xiangyang Elementary School
- Changqing Elementary School
- Gardens Elementary School
- Hunan Elementary School
- Tiedong Teachers' College for Vocational Studies Affiliated Elementary School
- Qinghua Elementary School
- Fengguang Elementary School
- Xinhua Elementary School
- Heping Elementary School
- Nanchangdian Elementary School

Middle Schools

- No.2 Middle School
- No.15 Middle School (华育外国语实验学校)
- No.26 Middle School
- No.29 Middle School
- No.31 Middle School
- Huayu Foreign Language Experimental School (华育外国语实验学校)
- Anshan Normal University Middle School

High Schools

- No.1 High School
- No.9 High School
- Angang High School
- Tianjiabing Senior High School
- Tiyuchang Road Vocational Senior High School
- Qianshan Senior High School
- Tianjiabing Senior High School
- Lankai Fine Arts Senior High School
- Xinyuan Senior High School
