= Zhao Hong Wenguo =

- 趙洪文國
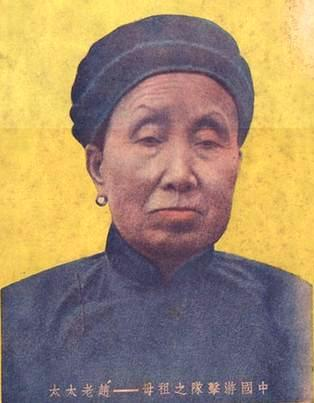
- Zhao Hong Wenguo on the cover of an issue of Ta Mei Pictorial
- Born: Hong Wenguo; 1881; Xiuyan, Fengtian, Qing Empire
- Died: 1950 (aged 68–69); Shifang, Sichuan, People’s Republic of China
- Occupations: Warlord, Resistance Organizer
- Years active: 1931–1949
- Spouse: Zhao Yuhuang
- Children: Zhao Dong

Chinese name
- Traditional Chinese: 趙洪文國
- Simplified Chinese: 赵洪文国
Transcriptions
Standard Mandarin
- Hanyu Pinyin: Zhào Hóng Wén Guó
- Wade–Giles: Chao Hung Wen-kuo

Zhao Hong Wenguo (Chinese: 趙洪文國; Wade–Giles: Chao Hung Wen-kuo; 1881–1950), known commonly as Double Gun Grandma, was a Manchu of the Bordered Yellow Banner and the Aisin-Gioro Clan, an active fighter and organizer against the Empire of Japan who helped mobilize her family of 30 people and many other Manchurians to fight against Japan in the Second Sino-Japanese War in Anti-Japanese volunteer armies.

In April 1949, at the end of the Second Chinese Civil War, Zhao Hongwenguo organized guerrillas for the KMT and established a guerrilla zone on the mainland to resist the People's Liberation Army entering Sichuan. In February 1950, Zhao was arrested and executed after refusing to surrender.

== Early life ==
Hong Wenguo was born in Hongqigou, Xiuyan, Fengtian Fu in 1881 to an impoverished family. She experienced the events of the First Sino-Japanese War at the age of 14. She married Zhao Yuhuang in 1898, taking his surname, and had 5 sons (one of which was Zhao Dong) and 3 daughters. Through her hard work, she gained respect in her village community and improved her family’s financial situation, elevating them to a higher position. She experienced the Russo-Japanese War at the age of 24, and the Mukden Incident at the age of 50.

== Post-Mukden Incident ==
During the Mukden Incident, Zhao’s third son, Zhao Dong, joined the Young China Party while studying Physics at Dongbei University. After the Mukden Incident, Zhao Dong and his friends went to Beiping to set up the Northeastern Students’ Army. In 1932, Zhao Dong returned to Manchuria. In February 1934, him and his group created the China Youth Iron Blood Army, with Zhao Dong as Chief of Staff. When his friend died in July 1935, he took up the position of Commanding Officer in his stead.

Zhao Hong Wenguo was busy selling her family property in order to fund Anti-Japanese resistance efforts and training her family. She was known for her heavy discipline, and ordered her family not to be greedy, not to harm pregnant women, and not to argue and go against orders. She attempted to restore her war-torn family elementary school and used Chinese language textbooks in order to prevent the spread of Japanese culture. In February 1934, the Imperial Japanese Army discovered that the Zhao family was at the root of the China Youth Iron Blood Army, promptly raiding her house and burning it down. In March, Zhao left to buy a printer, which she would later put in the elementary school and use to print Anti-Japanese propaganda. In August 1934, the IJA attacked her family again, imprisoning 300 of her family members and townspeople. Zhao refused to surrender and escaped from the IJA to Beiping, calling on the Northeast Anti-Japanese Association to assist the China Youth Iron Blood Army.

== Activity in the Central Plain ==
By December 1935, the China Youth Iron Blood Army was expanding its influence to the Liaodong Peninsula. The group was split into 11 divisions, with 11000 people in total. They created the Liaoning Provisional Government, with Zhao Dong as President. Some sources claim they participated in 300 battles of various sizes, killing 4,000, with 2,000 Japanese soldiers being killed. In May 1936, Zhao Hong Wenguo decided that she would go and help the Army, but due to the Japanese blockade, she was stopped. In the spring of 1937, the China Youth Iron Blood Army ran into trouble, with Zhao Dong visiting his mother in Beiping to call for aid. Because of the chaos Beiping was experiencing during the Marco Polo Bridge Incident, Zhao Dong stayed, never to return to Manchuria, and instead choosing to organize uprisings in the outskirts of Beiping. On the night of July 20, 1937, he helped start an uprising at Baiyang, Southwest of Beiping, proclaiming the North China People’s Anti-Japanese Army. Zhao Hong Wenguo helped to transport supplies to this Army, hidden in civilian clothes, as well as transporting guerilla fighters.

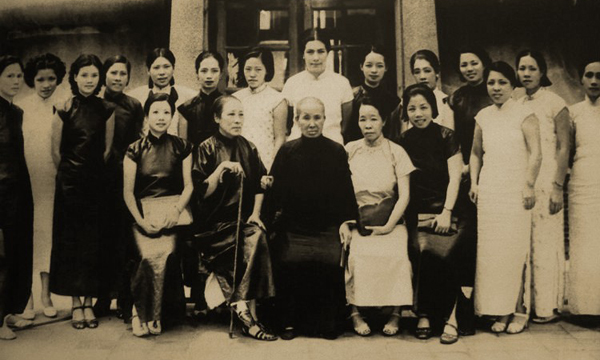
Zhao Hong "Double Gun Grandma" Wenguo, recruiting guerrilla fighters against Japan. Second to the left in the first row is Deng Yingchao, and the first one to the right in the first row is He Xiangning.

In September 1937, Zhao went to Wuhan to organize Anti-Japanese resistance. On her way there, in Henan, she helped two of her daughters set up an Anti-Japanese army named the Anti-Japanese Light Restoration Army, allegedly consisting of 10,000 members, which later tried to joined forces with other Anti-Japanese militias. The Light Restoration Army failed due to divisions in its upper ranks. After Zhao left, the North China People’s Anti-Japanese Army broke into the Beiping Second Model Prison, rescued more than 1,000 prisoners, including Communists, and shot down a Japanese plane. The Army grew to a force of 25,000, with guerilla fighters stationed across Northern China. When the Chinese Communist Party learned about this, they sent people into the Army and gradually assimilated it into the CCP. The commander of the Eighth Route Army, Zhu De, and the deputy commander, Peng Dehuai, invited the North China People’s Anti-Japanese Army to join the Fifth Brigade of the Eighth Route Army.
