= Tiexi District =

Tiexi District (simplified Chinese: 铁西区; traditional Chinese: 鐵西區; pinyin: Tiěxī Qū) may refer to the following locations in China's Northeast:

- Tiexi District, Anshan, Liaoning
- Tiexi District, Shenyang, Liaoning
- Tiexi District, Siping, Jilin Province

== See also ==
- Tie Xi Qu: West of the Tracks, documentary shot in Tiexi District, Shenyang
