= Anshan =

Anshan 鞍山市
- Prefecture-level city
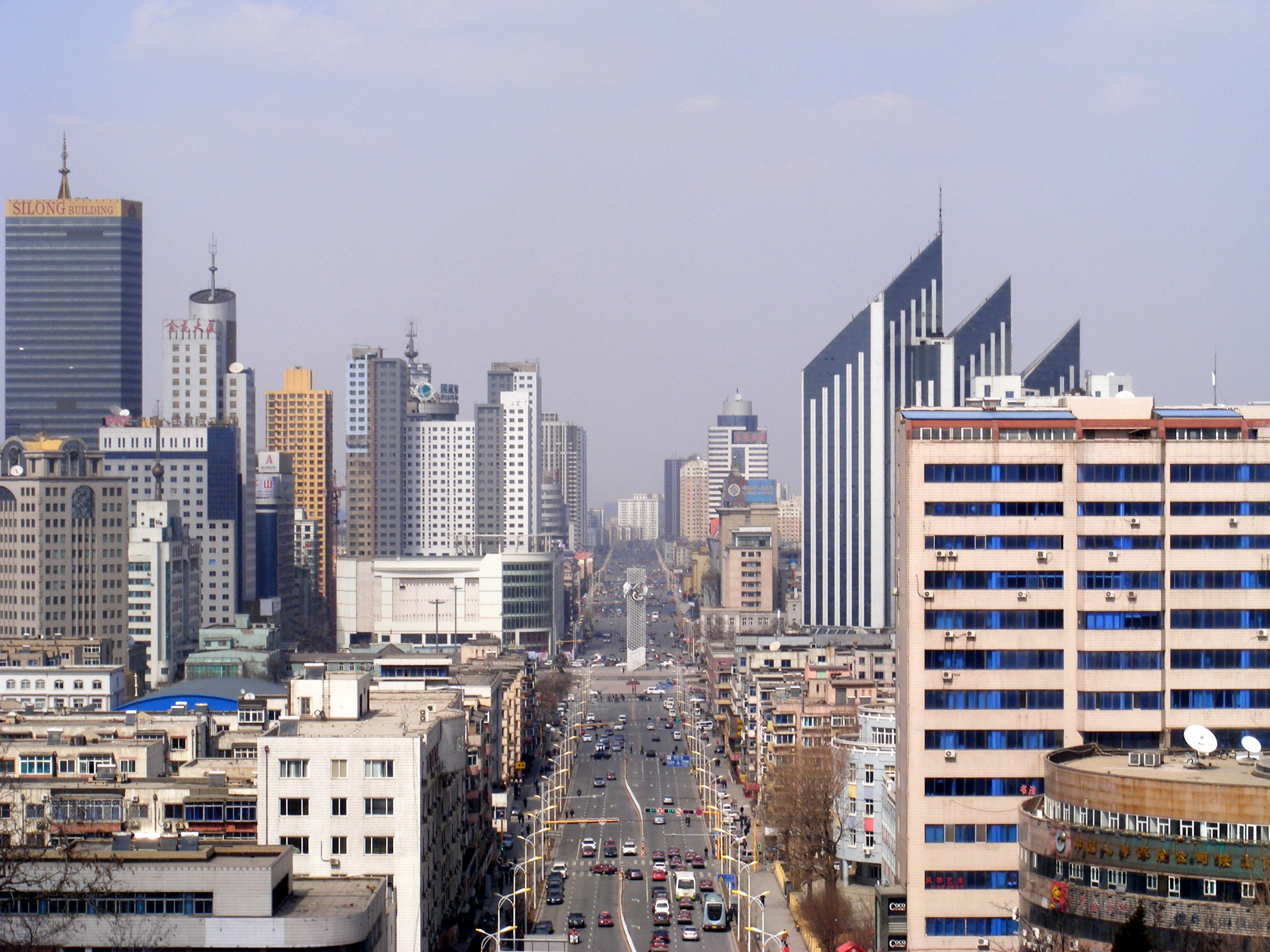
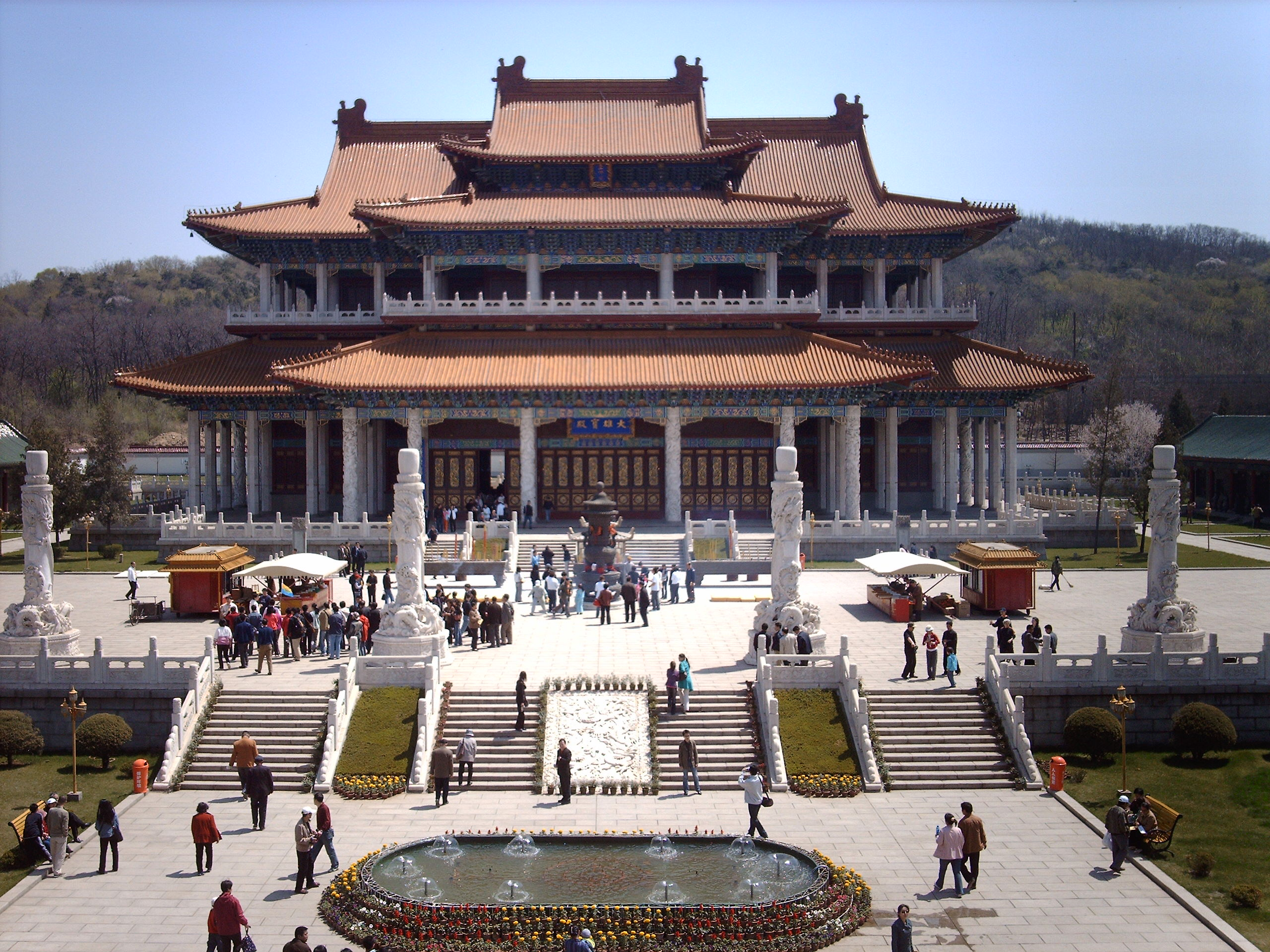
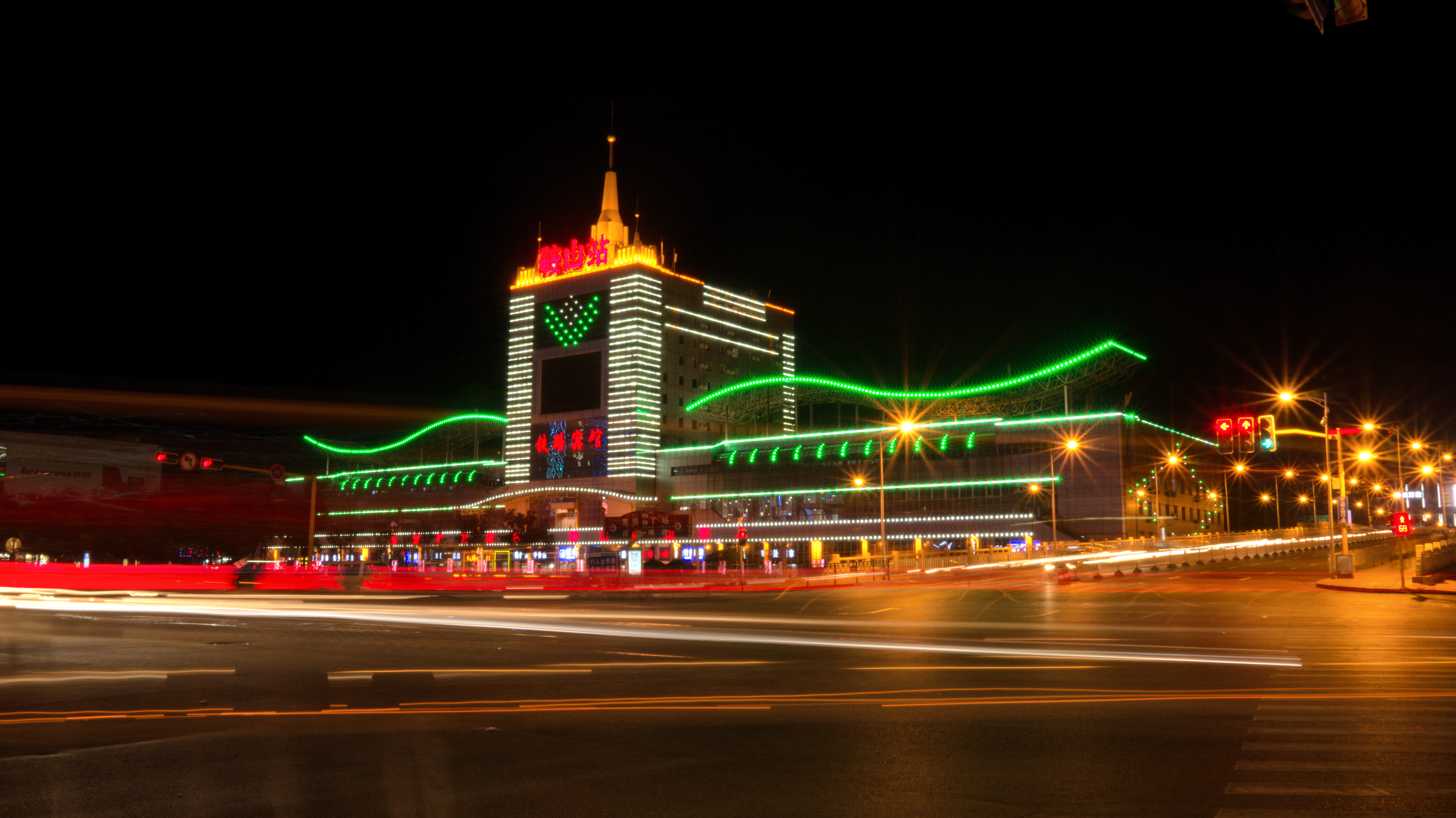
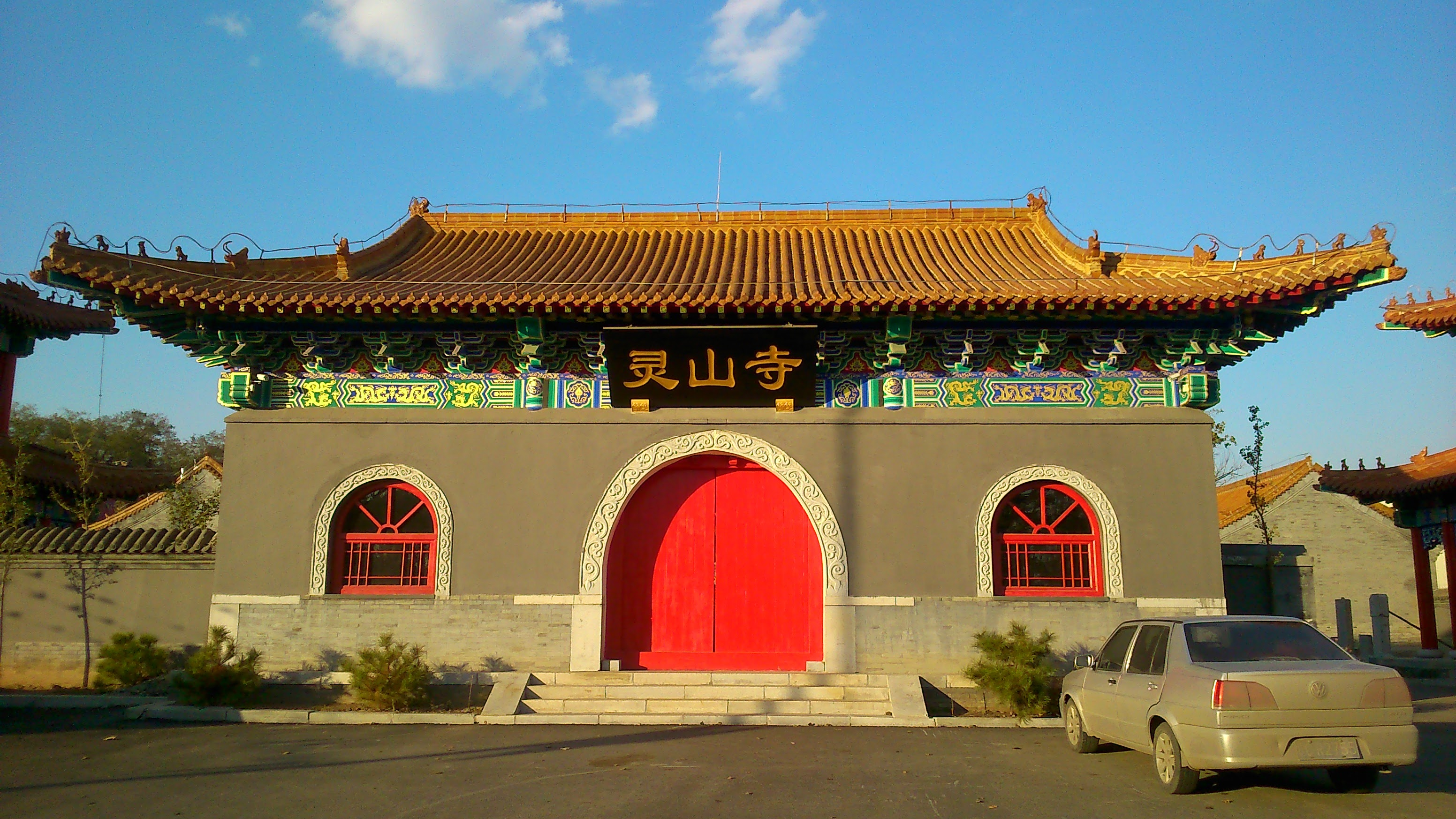
- Left to right, top to bottom: Anshan skyline, the Jade Buddha Palace, the Anshan railway station, Lishan Temple

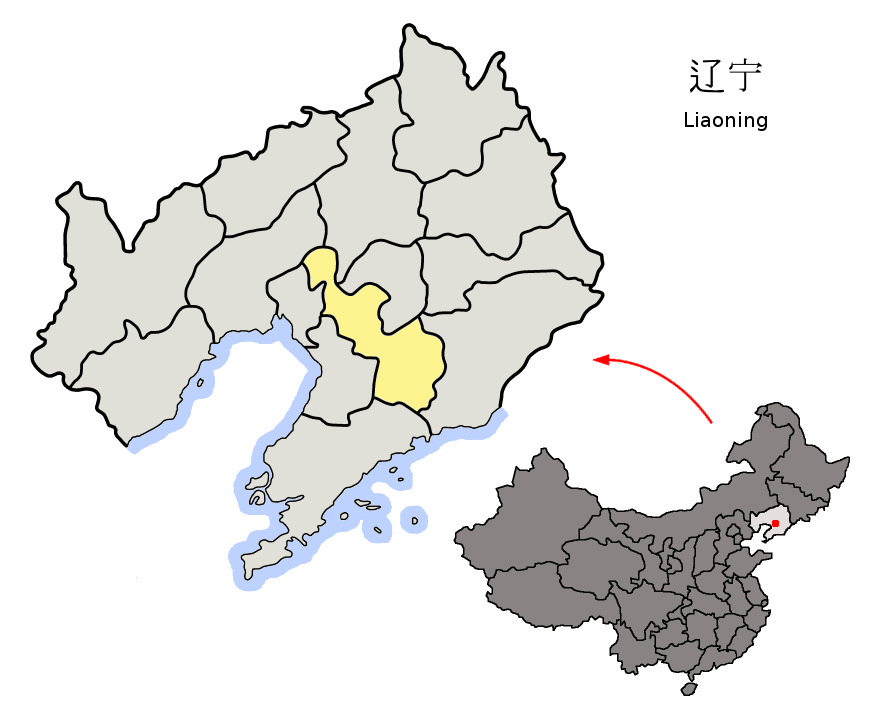
- Location of Anshan City jurisdiction in Liaoning

- Location of the city centre in Liaoning
- Coordinates (Anshan municipal government): 41°06′29″N 122°59′38″E
- Country: People's Republic of China
- Province: Liaoning
- Municipal seat: Tiedong District
- Districts and Counties: List: Tiedong District; Tiexi District; Lishan District; Qianshan District; Haicheng City; Tai'an County; Xiuyan Manchu Autonomous County

Government
  - Party Secretary: Wang Shiwei
  - Mayor: Wu Zhongqiong

Area
  - Prefecture-level city: 9,270 km^{2} (3,580 sq mi)
  - Land: 8,563 km^{2} (3,306 sq mi)
  - Water: 689 km^{2} (266 sq mi) 7.4%
  - Urban: 794.9 km^{2} (306.9 sq mi)
  - Metro: 3,997.8 km^{2} (1,543.6 sq mi)
- Highest elevation: 1,141 m (3,743 ft)
- Lowest elevation: 2 m (6.6 ft)

Population (2020 census)
  - Prefecture-level city: 3,325,372
  - Density: 388.3/km^{2} (1,006/sq mi)
  - Urban: 1,543,696
  - Urban density: 1,942/km^{2} (5,030/sq mi)
  - Metro: 2,712,789
  - Metro density: 678.57/km^{2} (1,757.5/sq mi)

GDP
  - Prefecture-level city: CN¥ 233.7 billion US$ 37.5 billion
  - Per capita: CN¥ 64,710; US$ 10,389
- Time zone: UTC+8 (China Standard)
- Postal code: 114010
- Area code: 412
- ISO 3166 code: CN-LN-03
- Licence plates: 辽C
- Administrative division code: 210300
- Website: Anshan.gov.cn

Anshan (Chinese: 鞍山; pinyin: Ānshān) is an inland prefecture-level city in central-southeast Liaoning province, People's Republic of China, about 92 kilometres (57 mi) south of the provincial capital Shenyang. As of the 2020 census, it was Liaoning's third most populous city with a population of 3,325,372 people, over an area of about 9,270 km^{2} (3,580 sq mi) spanning 133 km (83 mi) from east to west. Its built-up area encompassing the 4 Anshan urban districts (1,543,696 inhabitants), the 4 out of 5 urban Liaoyang districts (796,962 inhabitants, Gongchangling not being conurbated yet) and Liaoyang county largely being conurbated, was home to 2,712,789 inhabitants in 2020.

The city's name came from the horse saddle-like shape of a nearby mountain south of the city. Anshan is home to the Anshan Iron and Steel Group, one of the largest steel producers in China. Anshan is sister city with Sheffield, United Kingdom.

Anshan holds one-third of the world's supply of talcum and a quarter of the world's reserves of magnesite. Anshan also produced the largest ever jade stone, now a local tourist attraction carved as a Buddha statue.

== History ==
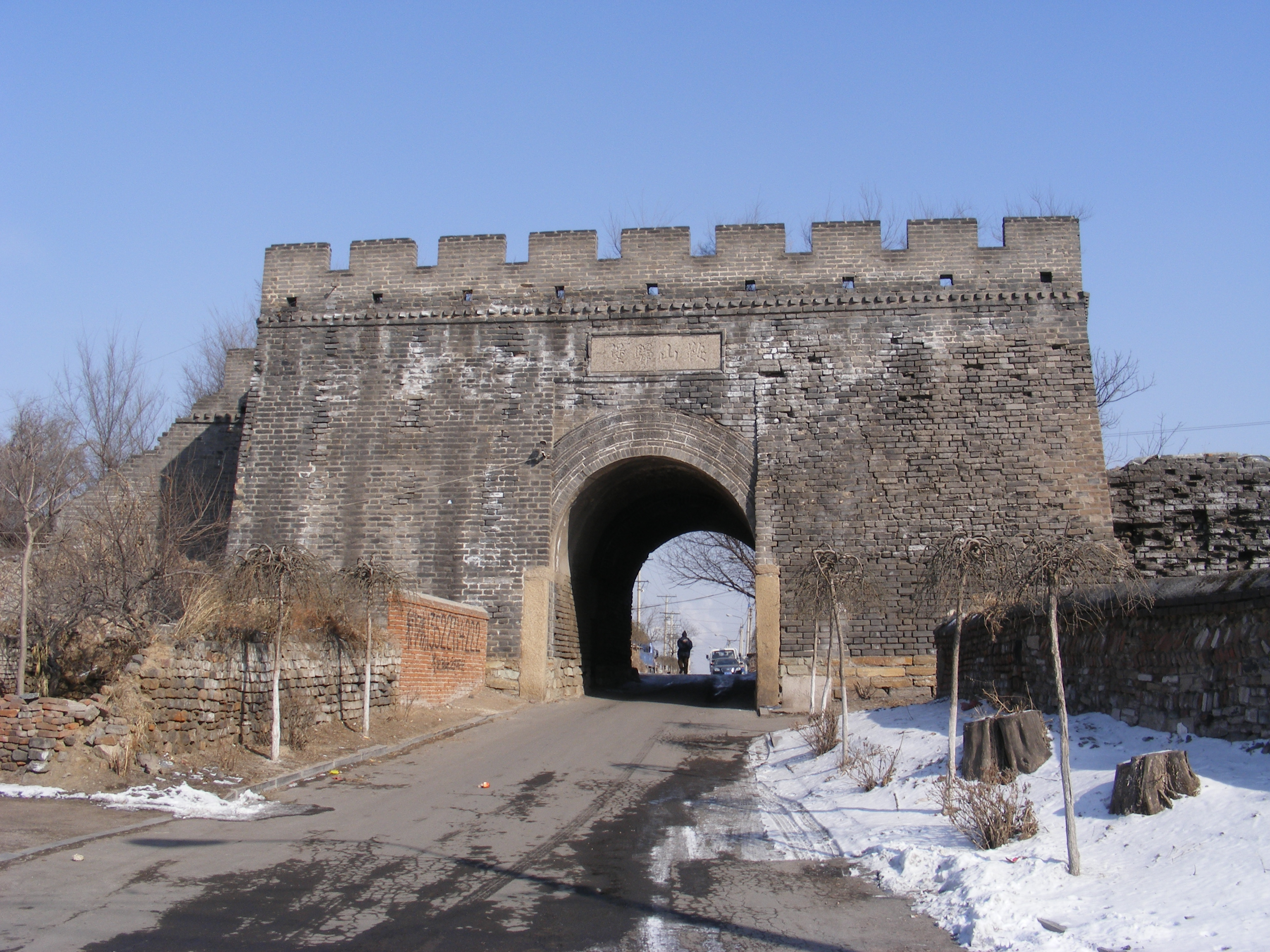
Anshan old city gate

The area of Anshan has been inhabited since prehistoric times. It has been a site of iron mining and metallurgy for over 2,000 years. The area remained of little significance, a small city in Liaodong province, overshadowed by neighbouring Liaoyang city, until the mid-20th Century.

In 1587, Anshan was fortified by the Ming Dynasty to combat the growing power of the Manchu. The city was burnt down during the Boxer Rebellion, and was destroyed again in the Russo-Japanese War (1904–1905). As a result of this war, Japan had gained influence in Liaoning and was engaged in industrialising the region. Anshan lay beside the new South Manchuria Railway line that ran from the port of Dalian to the major city of Shenyang.

As part of the economic privileges that Japan forced China to cede in 1915, Japan obtained concessions in Anshan.

From 1918 to 1945, Anshan was under Japanese colonial control and was a centre for modern iron and steel production. After the Mukden Incident in 1931, Japan occupied the northeast of China. The mills were turned into a Japanese-owned monopoly. In 1933, the site was expanded to include steel production and the company was renamed Showa Steel Works. Anshan became part of the Japanese puppet state of Manchukuo. In 1937, Puyi officially designated Anshan as a city. During Japanese colonial control, Anshan was ethnically separated, with Japanese living east of its railway line and Chinese living west of it. Schools in the city were also segregated.

Additional industries developed around the iron and steel mills. Anshan grew significantly in size around this new industrial site, becoming one of, if not the largest producers of iron and steel in Asia. It was therefore of strategic importance in the Pacific War, and was subject to several attacks by B-29 Superfortress strategic bombers of the USAAF. The Japanese Army detached the 1st Chutai (unit) of the 104th Sentai (squadron) of the Imperial Japanese Army Air Force, to Anshan, with other air squadrons for industrial defence purposes. Although this unit was equipped with modern Nakajima Ki-84 Ia (Manshu Type) Hayate "Frank" fighters, manufactured by Manshūkoku Hikōki Seizo KK, the plant suffered heavy damage from the air raids, losing up to 30% of its capacity.

After the war in Europe ended, the Soviet Union declared war on Japan, as the Red Army simultaneously launched Operation August Storm. Soviet forces advanced rapidly and soon captured much of Manchuria from the Japanese. In late 1945, the Soviet Red Army occupied a large amount of Liaoning and took major portions of the area's manufacturing and mining equipment to the Soviet Union.

With the defeat of Japan in 1945, Anshan was returned to China along with the rest of the Chinese Manchuria. Civil war continued between the Nationalists and the Chinese Communist Party (CCP). The Nationalist Government attempted to revive manufacturing in the area during their period of control from 1946 to 1948. The Nationalists withdrew from Anshan in February 1948.

The CCP entered the city on 28 February. Upon beginning governing in Anshan, CCP authorities sought to implement New Democracy by nationalizing some private enterprises with compensation and providing financial support to other private business. A significant amount of Japanese remained in Anshan, and they were governed indirectly by the CCP through an intermediary group of Japanese Communist cadre, which included members of the Japanese Communist Party who had been in the region before 1945, former Japanese soldiers who had been reeducated in Yan'an, and Japanese Communists recruited and trained by the CCP after 1945.

The northeast of China was marked out to become a major industrial centre for the new People's Republic of China. Anshan became a key part of China's approach to "socialist industrialization" which, modeled after the Soviet approach, focused on the development of heavy industry state-owned enterprises. Its mining and manufacturing industries had to be rebuilt almost from scratch, however. During this period, Anshan was given the same status as provinces, although it was reversed after the period ended. In December 1948, the Anshan Iron and Steel Company—also known as Angang—was founded. It was a centre of industrialization as part of China's First Five-Year Plan. Production in the newly repaired steel plant resumed on July 9, 1949. The plant was the largest steel producer in China. Anshan developed the nickname, "Steel Metropolis". Other industries set up alongside the steel plant including mining for coal, iron and other minerals.

Anshan became a formal administrative region under the Northeastern People's Government (later renamed as the Northeastern Administration Commission) in November 1949.

Anshan is reported to have served as a base for Soviet MIG fighter aircraft and pilots during the Korean War (1950–1953) in air combat operations against US/UN forces.

In 1954, Indian Prime Minister Jawaharlal Nehru visited Anshan.

On 12 March 1953, the city became a municipality under the Central Government's direct administration. Haicheng County and Xiuyan County were subordinated to Liaodong Province. Tai'an County was subordinated to Liaoxi Province. On 22 August 1954, the central government decided that Anshan should be administered by Liaoning Province.

During the Cultural Revolution, on 17 August 1967, the CCP's central authorities issued the Resolution on the Anshan Question which criticized the CCP Angang Committee and the CCP Anshan City Committee members as capitalist roaders. Three days later, the Anshan City Military Control Committee was established by the People's Liberation Army with Zhang Feng and Chen Shaokun as the Committee directors. The Committee implemented military control over both Angang and Anshan. On 20 March 1968, the city's Revolutionary Committee was created.

The State Council confirmed that Anshan should be in charge of Xiuyan County and Haicheng City in 1985.

The furnaces of the steel plant were changed in the 1980s to designs which blow oxygen in from the front. This increased the production and also reduced pollution. In the 1990s, they were additionally altered to blow oxygen in from the top as well. This further increases production and reduces pollution. In December 2000, all three production lines of Anshan Iron and Steel Company switched from mould-casting to continuous casting. This new technology has significantly reduced the dust and other pollution in the city. The new plant equipment is also much less labour-intensive. This has meant a reduction in the workforce has caused an unemployment problem in the city. A new drive to market Anshan as a tourist destination is hoped to help bolster the city's economy.

== Geography ==
Located north of the Liao River plains, Anshan has wide flat lands in the west and central regions that develop into hilly and mountainous terrain on the southeastern fringes, which is bounded by the Qian Mountains and contains the famous Qianshan National Park. The region is rich in minerals including iron ore, coal, magnesite, talcum and jade. The plains of western Anshan have large flat fertile fields ideal for agriculture, with 24,480 hectares (60,500 acres) of arable land accounting for 26.4% of its total land area. One such agricultural product that Anshan has become renowned for is the Nanguo pears (Chinese: 南果梨, Pyrus ussuriensis c.v. Nanguo), nicknamed the "king of pears". Anshan was used as a travel post with motels during the Ming Dynasty (Chinese: 明朝) for travellers who passed by on work duty.

=== Climate ===
Anshan has a monsoon-influenced humid continental climate (Köppen Dwa) characterised by hot, humid summers, due to the monsoon, and rather long, cold, and arid winters, due to the Siberian anticyclone. The four seasons here are distinctive. Nearly half of the annual rainfall occurs in July and August. The monthly 24-hour average temperatures ranges from −7.6 °C (18.3 °F) in January to 25.9 °C (78.6 °F) in July, while the annual mean is 10.6 °C (51.1 °F). Sunshine is generous and amounts to 2,595.4 hours annually, while relative humidity averages 55%, ranging from 44% in April to 71% in July and August. Extreme temperatures have ranged from −26.9 °C (−16.4 °F) up to 38.2 °C (100.8 °F).

Climate data for Anshan, elevation 77 m (253 ft), (1991–2020 normals, extremes 1971–present)
Month	Jan	Feb	Mar	Apr	May	Jun	Jul	Aug	Sep	Oct	Nov	Dec	Year
Record high °C (°F)	8.9 (48.0)	17.5 (63.5)	26.1 (79.0)	30.2 (86.4)	34.7 (94.5)	36.5 (97.7)	36.7 (98.1)	38.2 (100.8)	32.6 (90.7)	29.2 (84.6)	22.7 (72.9)	15.5 (59.9)	38.2 (100.8)
Mean daily maximum °C (°F)	−3.3 (26.1)	1.2 (34.2)	8.4 (47.1)	17.4 (63.3)	24.2 (75.6)	28.0 (82.4)	30.0 (86.0)	29.2 (84.6)	24.9 (76.8)	17.1 (62.8)	7.1 (44.8)	−0.7 (30.7)	15.3 (59.5)
Daily mean °C (°F)	−7.6 (18.3)	−3.3 (26.1)	3.6 (38.5)	12.1 (53.8)	18.9 (66.0)	23.3 (73.9)	25.9 (78.6)	25.0 (77.0)	19.9 (67.8)	12.1 (53.8)	2.7 (36.9)	−5.0 (23.0)	10.6 (51.1)
Mean daily minimum °C (°F)	−11.2 (11.8)	−7.1 (19.2)	−0.5 (31.1)	7.5 (45.5)	14.1 (57.4)	19.0 (66.2)	22.3 (72.1)	21.4 (70.5)	15.5 (59.9)	7.7 (45.9)	−1.1 (30.0)	−8.6 (16.5)	6.6 (43.8)
Record low °C (°F)	−26.9 (−16.4)	−23.9 (−11.0)	−24.0 (−11.2)	−6.3 (20.7)	1.2 (34.2)	8.0 (46.4)	13.6 (56.5)	9.5 (49.1)	1.7 (35.1)	−6.2 (20.8)	−16.0 (3.2)	−24.5 (−12.1)	−26.9 (−16.4)
Average precipitation mm (inches)	8.1 (0.32)	10.1 (0.40)	17.7 (0.70)	37.2 (1.46)	65.4 (2.57)	87.6 (3.45)	154.8 (6.09)	180.2 (7.09)	54.7 (2.15)	44.9 (1.77)	27.6 (1.09)	13.0 (0.51)	701.3 (27.6)
Average precipitation days (≥ 0.1 mm)	3.6	3.5	4.6	7.0	8.5	11.1	13.2	11.0	7.5	6.6	5.2	3.7	85.5
Average snowy days	5.7	4.8	4.2	1.2	0	0	0	0	0	0.4	4.3	6.0	26.6
Average relative humidity (%)	53	47	45	44	49	60	71	71	61	54	54	54	55
Mean monthly sunshine hours	186.1	196.4	236.2	241.5	270.5	238.5	213.6	222.4	236.3	213.2	173.1	167.6	2,595.4
Percentage possible sunshine	62	65	64	60	60	53	47	53	64	63	59	59	59
Source 1: China Meteorological Administrationall-time extreme temperature
Source 2: Weather China

== Administrative divisions ==
Anshan is divided into four districts, one city, one county and one autonomous county.

Map
Name	Chinese (S)	Hanyu Pinyin	Population (2003 est.)	Area (km^{2})	Density (/km^{2})
Tiedong District	铁东区	Tiědōng Qū	490,000	30	16,333
Tiexi District	铁西区	Tiěxī Qū	290,000	34	8,529
Lishan District	立山区	Lìshān Qū	420,000	55	7,636
Qianshan District	千山区	Qiānshān Qū	260,000	503	517
Haicheng City	海城市	Hǎichéng Shì	1,130,000	2,732	414
Tai'an County	台安县	Tái'ān Xiàn	380,000	1,393	273
Xiuyan Manchu Autonomous County	岫岩满族 自治县	Xiùyán Mǎnzú; Zìzhìxiàn	510,000	4,502	113

== Economy ==
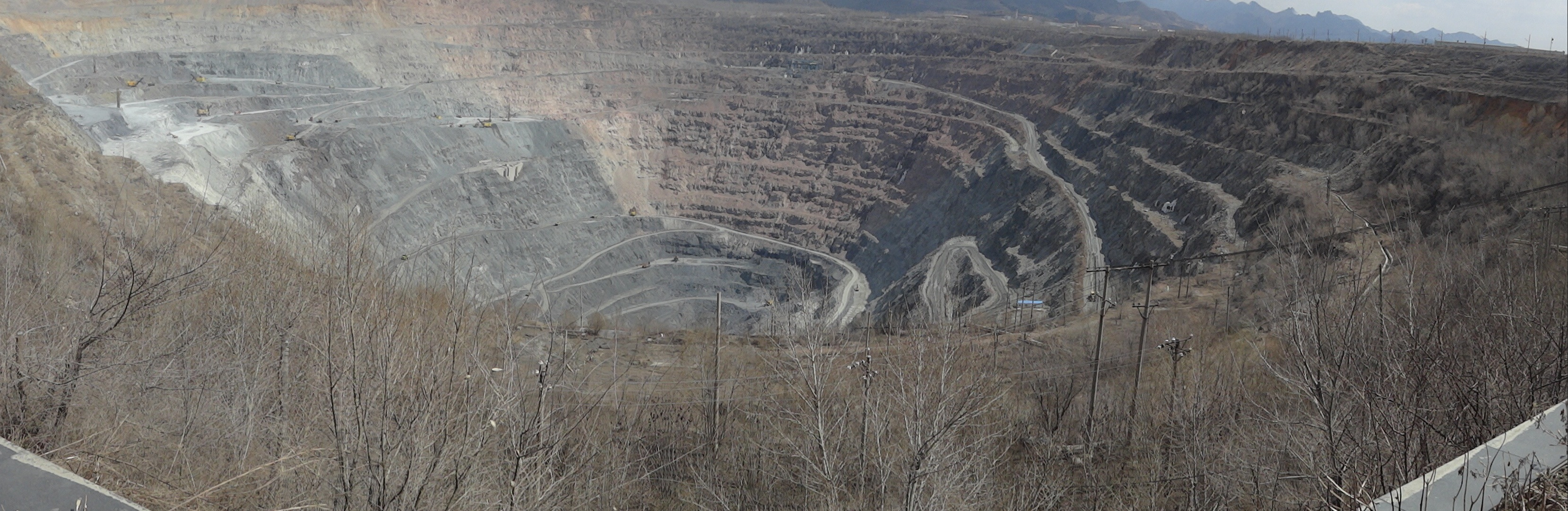
Qidashan open cast iron ore mine, one of three large pits surrounding Anshan city

The north east of China is a major industrial zone and Anshan is one of the key sites of the north east. Anshan is in the midst of a at least a quarter of China's iron and coal resources. The city is renowned as "China's capital of iron and steel". Prior to the development of the Iron and Steel industries, Anshan was a relatively small city of little importance. As the steel mills expanded, so to did the city. Spin off industries developed alongside the steel plant making the area a centre of heavy industry.

As a joint Sino-Japanese venture, Anshan Zhenzing Iron Ore Company Unlimited was started in Anshan in 1918. When Japan occupied Northeast China in 1931, these mills were turned into a Japanese owned monopoly. Anshan subsequently became part of the Japanese puppet state of Manchukuo and additional industries developed around the iron and steel mills. Due to its mills, the city became a significant strategic industrial hub during World War II and as such, was subject to constant Allied bombing during the war.

Total production of processed iron in Manchuria reached 1,000,000 tonnes in 1931–32, of which almost half was made by Shōwa Steel in Anshan. Iron production grew to 7,000,000 tonnes in 1938 and by 1941, Shōwa Steel Works had a total capacity production of 1,750,000 tonnes of iron bars and 1,000,000 tonnes of processed steel. By 1942, Anshan's Shōwa Steel Works total production capacity reached 3,600,000 tonnes, making it one of the major iron and steel centers in the world.

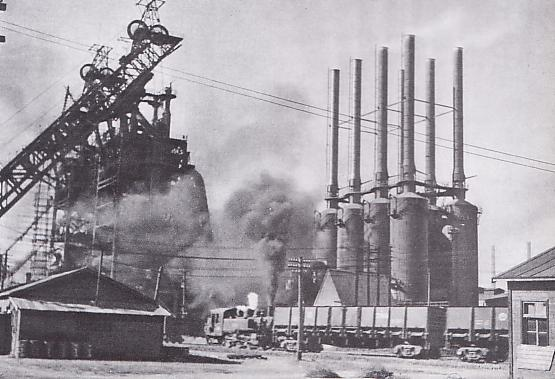
An Gang steel company before 1945

In 1945, the steel plant was looted by Soviet forces. The Republic of China government partially repaired the site, but it was destroyed again during the Chinese Civil War that saw the CCP forces victorious. The mills were once again repaired and Anshan Iron and Steel Company (Angang) was founded in 1948. From then to 2001, the company produced 290 million tons of steel, 284 million tons of pig iron and 192 million tons of rolled steel. Until the opening of a new steel plant in Shanghai, Angang was the largest steel producer in China. Today, Angang consists of three steelworks with 13 rolling mills plus supporting plants which produce coke, refractory materials and machinery for the steel plants. The company has an annual production capacity of 10 million tons of pig iron, 10 million tons of steel and 9.5 million tons of rolled steel. A quarter of China's total iron ore reserves, about 10 billion tons, are located in Anshan, ensuring that the city will remain an important steel producer well into the future.

Anshan is rich in other mineral wealth too. The southern and south eastern areas of Anshan are rich in magnesite, with reserves equivalent to a quarter of all worldwide reserves. Anshan also has the world's largest reserve of talcum, accounting for fully one third of the entire world supply. The Xiuyan area of Anshan is known for the production of jade. The largest single jade stone ever found came from Xiuyan, now carved into the form of a Buddha, it is a major tourist attraction in the area.

Anshan is serviced by Shenyang airport, about 90 kilometres (56 miles) to the north, and by two major highways linking it with Shenyang and Dalian.

The government of Anshan established a five-year plan in 2000 with the aim of turning the city into a strong modern industrial city with plenty of tourism. It also aimed to make the city GDP reach 100 billion RMB by 2005 and to build a modern industrial city by using advances in technology to transform the traditional industries. Attracting foreign investment is also another main idea in the plan. The Anshan government anticipates the foreign investment assets would be around 80 billion RMB by 2005.

Anshan has been identified by the Economist Intelligence Unit in the November 2010 Access China White Paper as a member of the CHAMPS (Chongqing, Hefei, Anshan, Maanshan, Pingdingshan and Shenyang), an economic profile of the top 20 emerging cities in China. The opportunities for engaging Anshan's consumers have been documented by the ethnographer and cultural sociologist Michael B. Griffiths.

== Demographics ==
Out of the 3,584,000 people living in Anshan prefecture, 519,400 are ethnic Manchu, a holdover from northeast China's historical rule by the ethnic group. They are mainly in or around the Xiuyan Man regional ethnic autonomy area which is within Anshan's borders. During the last years of the Qing dynasty, large numbers of Han people migrated to the north east in search of work. This pattern continued into the 20th century. The development of Anshan as a large industrial center during and after World War II caused the city's population to increase rapidly, and the new arrivals began to significantly outnumber the local Man people. As of the last census data, Anshan was home to 48 Chinese ethnic groups. The Han people make up the lion's share at 3,020,500 people. Next, after the Han and Man people, come the Hui and the Chaoxian with 23,400 and 10,000 people respectively. The Hui population is widely dispersed but the Chaoxian population is mostly concentrated in Teixi (West district) and Qianshan district.

Anshan has a population of 3.65 million at the 2010 census. As the city has expanded, the area between Anshan and the neighbouring city of Liaoyang has become urbanised, with little or no farmland visible on route between them. According to the 2010 census, the conurbation of urban Anshan and urban Liaoyang districts contains 2.17 million inhabitants.

The city of Anshan can be divided into districts. The East district, Tiedong has a population of 452,900. The western district, Tiexi has 311,600 people. These two districts are demarcated by the railway lines that run north to south through the city. The north western portion of the city is dominated by the large steel works of Angang. The district of Lishan houses 425,600 people and the suburbs of Qianshan district have 366,200 soles. Within Anshan prefecture lies the subordinate city of Haicheng which accounts for 1,181,100 people. The neighbouring subordinate town of Tai'an has 354,700 people.

== Transportation ==
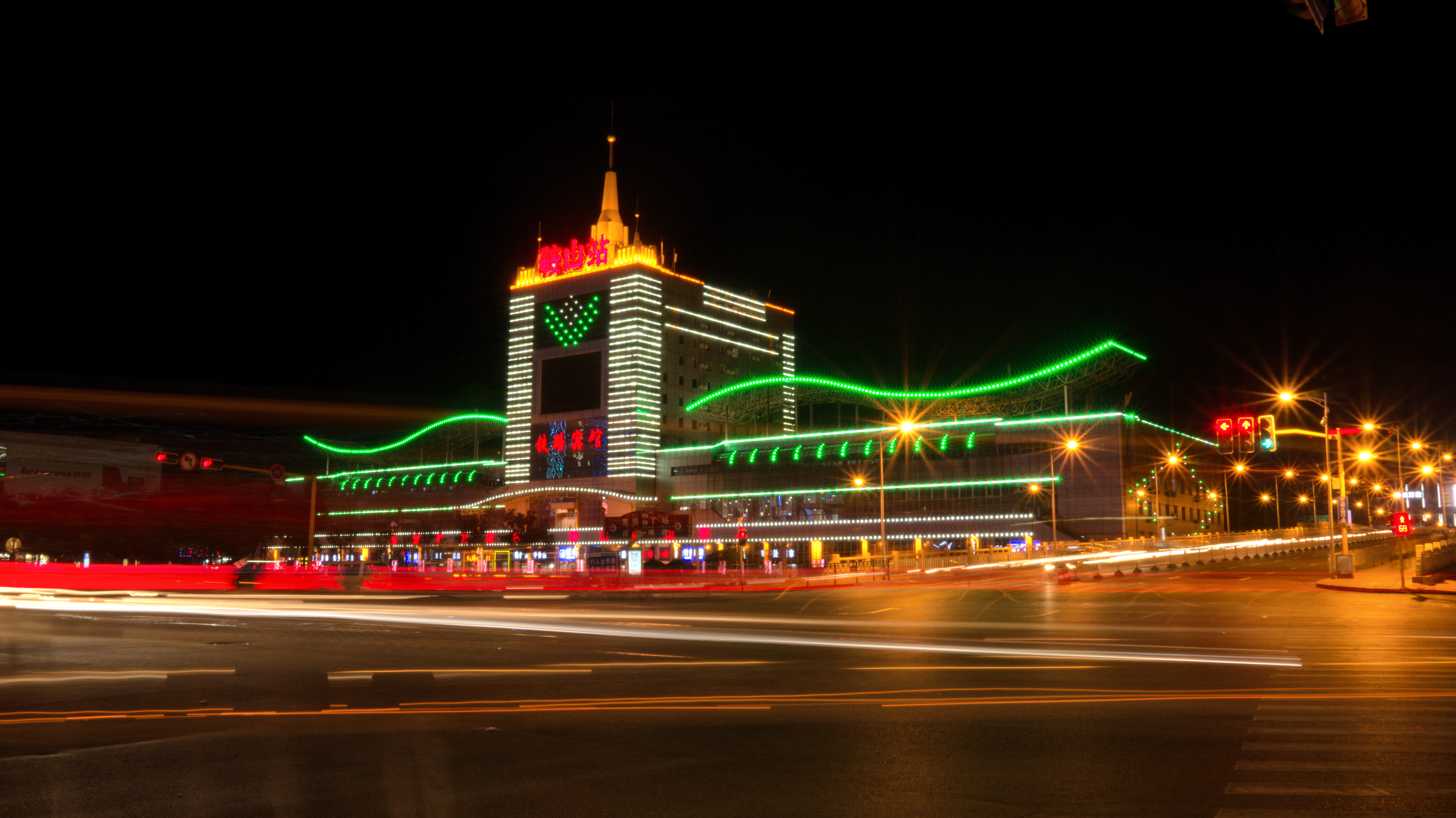
Anshan train station at night

Anshan has no river or sea port. The nearby military airport, Anshan Teng'ao Airport (AOG), also accepts commercial domestic flights. Currently there are five routes in operation, Anshan–Beijing, Shanghai, Guangzhou, Chengdu and Nanjing, with one flight each per day throughout the year. Anshan Teng'ao Airport is 15 km (9 mi) southwest of the city centre. In addition to the small terminal building at the airport, there is also a city terminal situated just off Qianshan Road in Tiexi district. Passengers may buy tickets and check-in at the city terminal, from which they are taken by coach to the main airport terminal. The nearest other major commercial airports are Shenyang Taoxian International Airport (SHE), about 90 km (56 mi) to the north and Dalian Zhoushuizi International Airport about 270 km (170 mi) to the south.

The city is beside the Shenyang–Dalian Expressway (part of the G15 Shenyang–Haikou Expressway), a privately funded eight-lane tolled highway, and was the first road of its kind in mainland China. The Liaozhong Ring Expressway (G91) passes just a few kilometers north of Anshan city. It connects east to Benxi and west onto the Jingshen Expressway (G1). The Panhai and Danxi Expressways (together forming the G16) pass through Anshan's counties of Haicheng and Xiuyan, connecting them to Yingkou and Panjin in the west and Dandong to the east.

Anshan is connected to the Chinese rail network with rail routes to Beijing, Dalian, and to the northeastern provinces of Jilin and Heilongjiang as well as to eastern Inner Mongolia, and even a direct, albeit slow, train to Hong Kong. As of December 2012, the new Harbin–Dalian High-Speed Railway serves Anshan West Railway Station and Haicheng West Railway Station. It connects south to Dalian and north east to Shenyang, Changchun and Harbin. This line was hailed as the world's first alpine high-speed rail line. In summer it runs at its full speed of 300 km/h but in winter speeds are restricted to 200 km/h. High-speed services also run via Anshan to Beijing. Tai'an county of Anshan is served by another high-speed rail line linking Shenyang to Beijing.

Long-distance coaches run to all the main cities of the province as well as to Beijing.

Local transportation is primarily by bus or taxi. Anshan used to have a single tram line—along Zhonghua Avenue, through the city centre and past Angang main gate—but this has been closed and the tracks removed. Due to the flat topography of the city centre, bicycles are popular. Almost all roads have a wide cycle lane on each side. Often this lane is further protected by a traffic island that separates the bikes from larger motor vehicles.

== Tourist attractions ==
In recent years, Anshan has been trying to throw off its image as a heavy industrial town along with the dirt and pollution that goes with such industry. It has remodeled itself as a tourist destination.

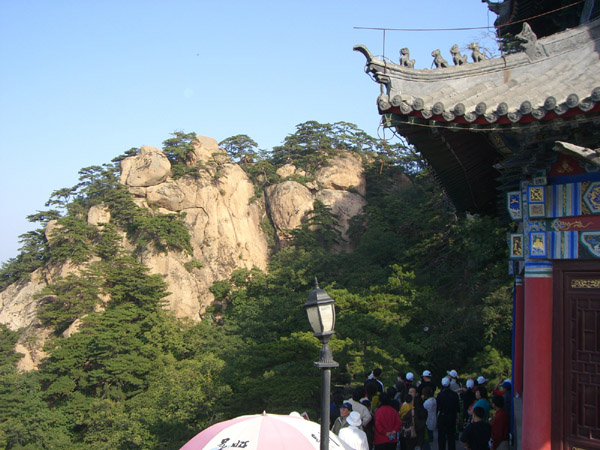
Qianshan National Park

Foremost among the attractions in Anshan is Qianshan National Park which is about 18 km (11 mi), by road, to the southeast of the city. Qianshan, literally 'Thousand Mountains', is an abbreviation of 'Thousand lotus flower mountains'. The peaks were said to resemble the petals of the lotus flower which had been dropped to earth by a goddess. The park area of 44 km^{2} (17 sq mi), is filled with both Buddhist and Taoist temples, monasteries and nunneries. It is one of few locations where both religions are found sharing the same site. Cars are not allowed within the park.

One of the mountains in the park is believed to resemble Maitreya Buddha. It is claimed to be the largest naturally occurring image of Maitreya in the world. Several temples have been built on the peaks of the overlooking hills. Near the Buddha is a bird park.

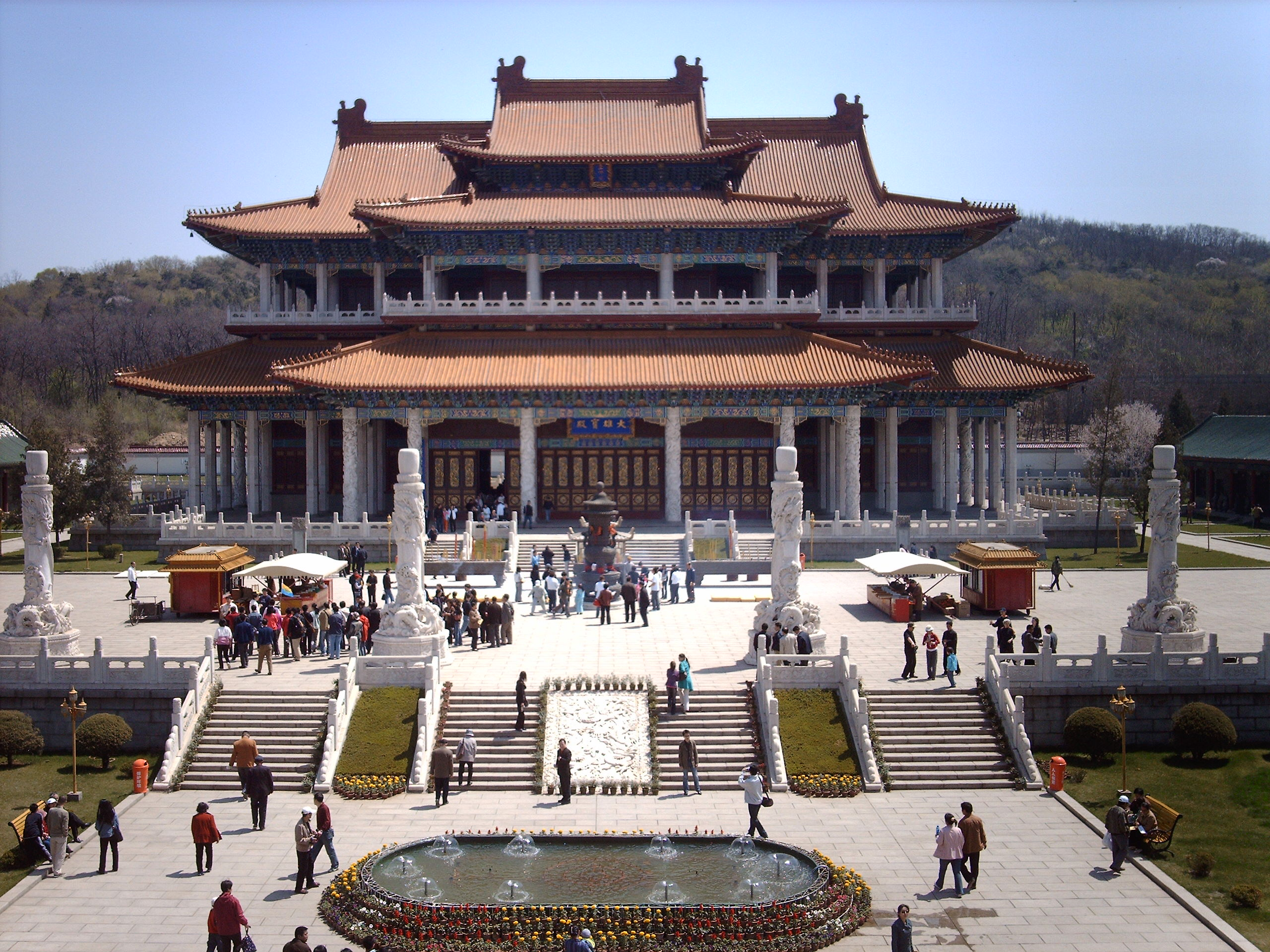
Jade Buddha Palace within 219 Park in Anshan houses the world's largest Buddha statue made entirely of jade.

Another major tourist location is "219 Park". The name of the park commemorates the liberation of Anshan by the People's Liberation Army on February 19, 1948. The park contains the Dongshan (East Mountain) scenic area as well as numerous lakes.

Of particular note is the Jade Buddha Palace. This large Buddhist temple complex of 22,104 square metres, houses the world's largest statue of Buddha made of Jade (It is called jade in Chinese, but in English it is Serpentine). It is a single piece of jade stone measuring 6.88 metres in width, 4.10 metres front to back and 7.95 metres high. The jade stone weighs 260.76 tons. The front of the stone has been carved with an image of Sakyamuni (aka. Gautama) Buddha. On the back of the stone Guanyin (aka. Avalokitesvara) Buddha has been carved. The jade stone was found in 1960 in Xiuyan County. It was declared a treasure of the State and listed as a protected property by Chinese Premier Zhou Enlai. Anshan city government commissioned the carving which took a team of 120 sculptures 18 months to complete. The temple complex was opened on September 3, 1996. The building that houses the Jade Buddha statue is 33 metres tall, representing the 33 layers of heaven in Buddhism. It claims to be one of the tallest two-story buildings of traditional Chinese architectural style in China.

Anshan contains naturally hot spring water spas. There are four spas/hotels in Anshan. Visitors may shower and bathe in the spring water. At Tanggangzi Spa, once frequented by the Qing Emperors of China, visitors may have mud treatment where they are buried in hot volcanic sand, which has been infused with the spring water. The geothermal energy is also used to provide hot steam and water for winter heating throughout the area.

Scenes of Anshan
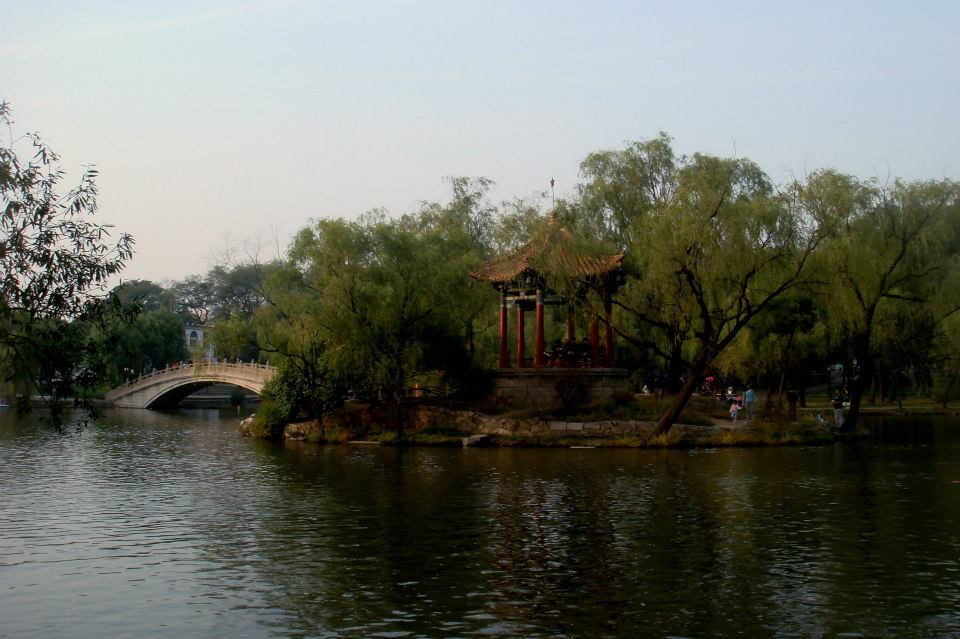
219 Park

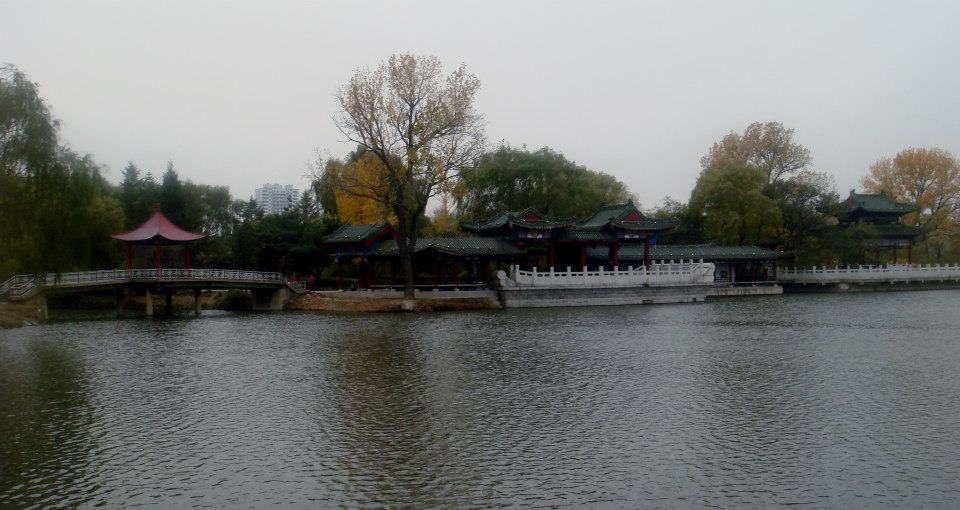
Lake view at Anshan's 219 Park

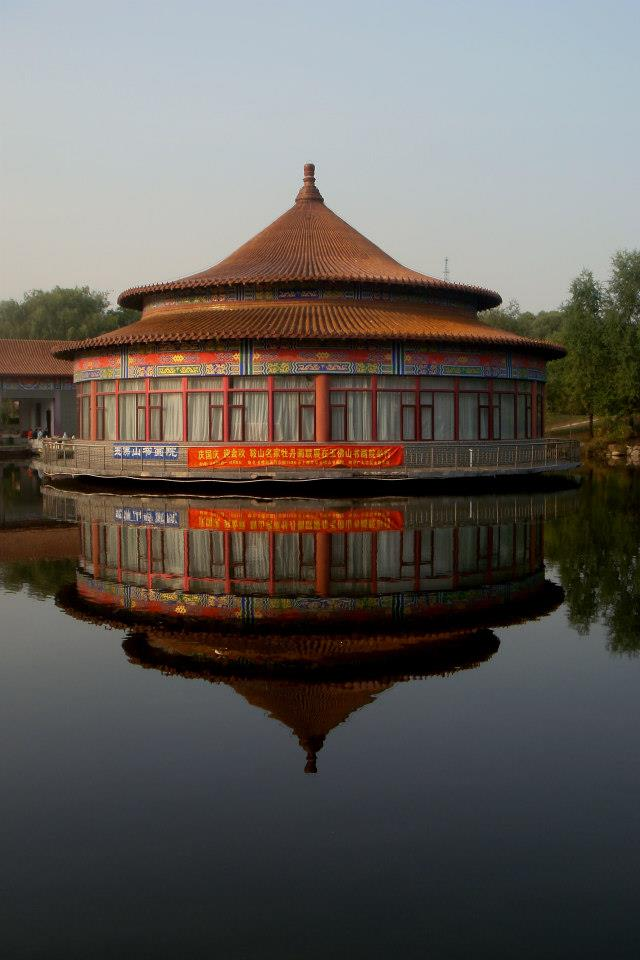
Tea house restaurant near Anshan 219 Park

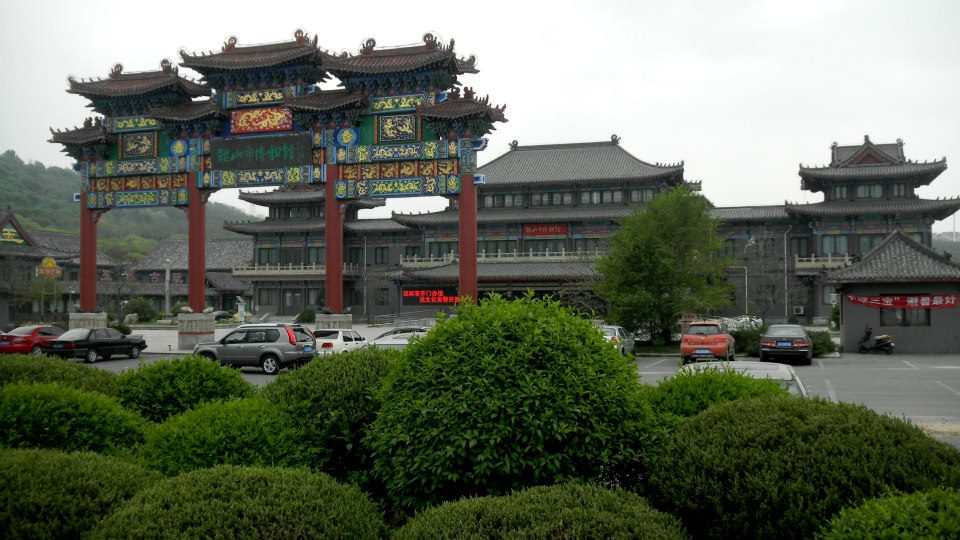
Anshan City Museum

== Education system ==
The city contains two large universities:

- Anshan Normal University
- University of Science and Technology Liaoning

== Notable people ==
- Kei Tomiyama (1938–1995), Japanese actor, voice actor, and narrator, born in Anshan
- Zhang Dejiang (b. 1946), retired politician, served as the Chairman of the Standing Committee of the National People's Congress of the 12th National People's Congress
- Ann Hui (b. 1947), Hong Kong New Wave film director, born in Anshan. Hui's 2006 film The Postmodern Life of My Aunt was partly set and filmed in Anshan.
- Guo Mingyi (b. 1958), philanthropist who began work at Anshan Iron and Steel Group
- Chen Xiaoxu (1965–2007), actress noted for playing Lin Daiyu
- Tang Xiao'ou (1968–2023), computer scientist and co-founder of SenseTime
- Lei Jiayin (b. 1983), actor noted for playing Chen Junsheng in The First Half of My Life
- Du Jing (b. 1984), female badminton player, former women's double champion
- Zhang Xiaofei (b. 1986), actress noted for her performance in Hi, Mom
- Chen Tao (b. 1986), footballer, most recently played as midfielder for Sichuan Longfor
- Zhang Wenzhao (b. 1987), footballer, most recently played as a midfielder for Beijing Renhe
- Li Jiahang (b. 1987), actor noted for playing Fu Erkang in New My Fair Princess.
- Li Man (b. 1988), actress noted for her role in Zhang Yimou's Curse of the Golden Flower.
- Li Xiaoxia (b. 1988), female table tennis player, Grand Slam champion.
- Guo Yue, table tennis player, 2007 women's world champion.
- Ma Long (b. 1988), widely considered the greatest table tennis player of all time.
- Wang Yanlin (b. 1989), actor
- Beiwen Zhang (b. 1990), Chinese-born American badminton player
- Xu Mengtao (b. 1990), 2022 Olympic Champion aerial skier.
- Xu Minghao (stage name The8; b. 1997), member of popular K-pop group Seventeen, born in Anshan
- Shao Jieni (b. 1994), Chinese-born Portuguese Olympic Table Tennis player.

== See also ==
- List of twin towns and sister cities in China
