= Chen Xiaoxu =

Chinese actress (1965–2007)

- Born: October 29, 1965; Anshan, Liaoning
- Died: May 13, 2007 (aged 41); Shenzhen, Guangdong
- Occupations: actress, bhikkhuni
- Spouse(s): Bi Yanjun (毕彦君), Hao Tong (郝彤)

Chinese name
- Traditional Chinese: 陳曉旭
- Simplified Chinese: 陈晓旭
Transcriptions
Standard Mandarin
- Hanyu Pinyin: Chén Xiǎoxù

Chen Xiaoxu (simplified Chinese: 陈晓旭; traditional Chinese: 陳曉旭; pinyin: Chén Xiǎoxù; October 29, 1965 – May 13, 2007), monastic name Miao Zhen (妙真) was a Chinese actress, famous for her role as Lin Daiyu in 1987 TV series Dream of the Red Chamber. On February 23, 2007, she became a bhikkhuni (Buddhist nun) in Baiguoxinglong Temple, Changchun (长春百国兴隆寺). She died of breast cancer on May 13, 2007.

== Biography ==
Chen Xiaoxu was born in Anshan, Liaoning in 1965. She became famous for her role as Lin Daiyu in Dream of the Red Chamber, a CCTV series in 1987.

However, Chen did not stay in the entertainment industry for long. She decided to begin a career in advertising. For a time, she was the General Manager for Shi Bang Advertisement Co. Ltd. (世邦广告有限公司) and Shi Bang Culture Development Co. Ltd. (世邦文化发展有限公司)

In 2007, less than two months before her death, Chen became a Buddhist nun, ordained by Master Chin Kung, and was given the Dharma name Miaozhen (妙真).

Chen died of breast cancer in Shenzhen on May 13, 2007.

== Achievements ==
- 1984-1987—was cast in the China Central Television series, Dream of Red Mansions, and played the role of Lin Daiyu
- 1988—was cast in the Shanghai TV series, The Family, Spring and Autumn (an adaptation of Ba Jin's fictional trilogy), and played the role of Cousin Mei.
- 1998 She became the general manager and director of Beijing Cultural Development Co, Ltd
- 2004 She was named one of "China's "30 outstanding women in advertising" in the competition of China's Advertising Billboard

== Personal life ==
Before the shooting of Dream of Red Mansions was completed, Chen married her boyfriend, whom she had known since childhood, and was her colleague in Anshan Modern Drama troupe. But the marriage did not last and ended in divorce.

Chen's second husband was Hao Tong, a student of Beijing Film Academy. Described as handsome and tall, he made her acquaintance due to graduate work. They both eventually turned to Buddhism.
