= Jade Buddha Palace =

Temple complex in Anshan, Liaoning, China

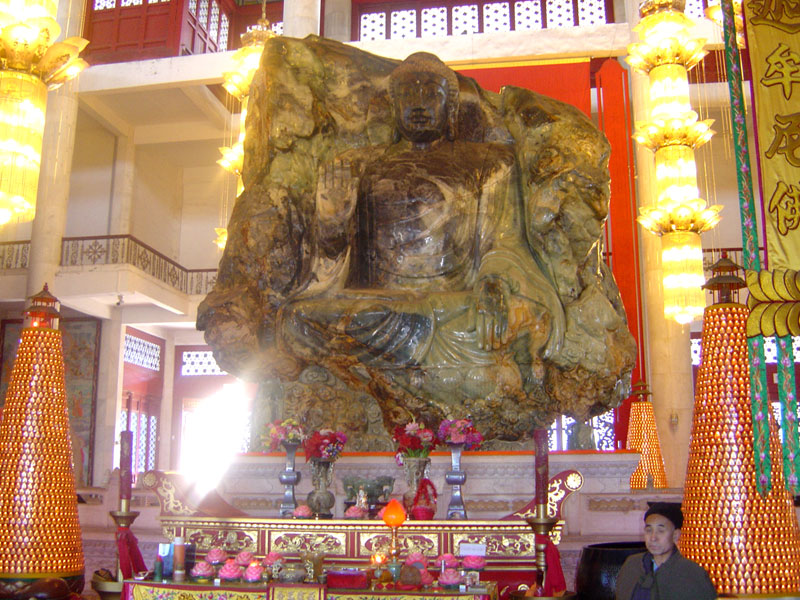
Front view of Anshan Jade Buddha

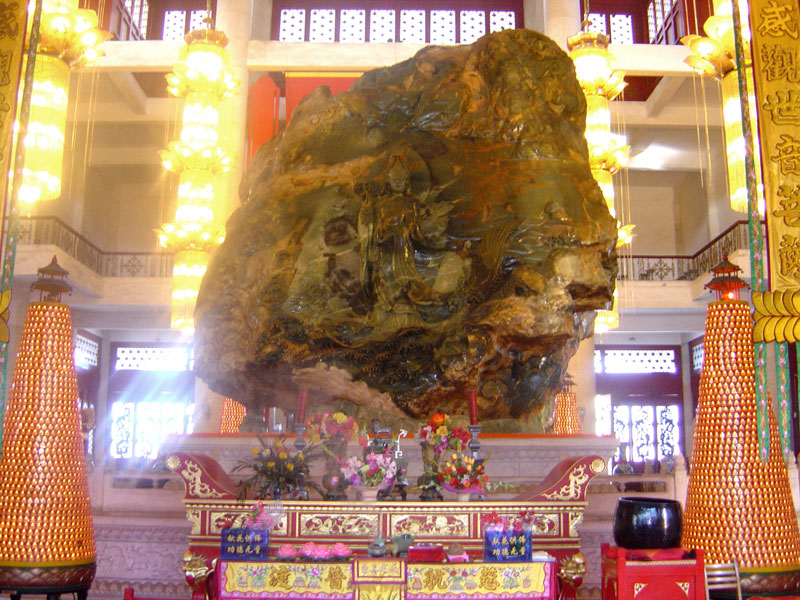
Rear view of Anshan Jade Buddha

Jade Buddha Palace (Chinese: 玉佛苑; pinyin: Yù Fó Yuàn, sometimes also translated as Jade Buddha Garden or Jade Buddha Temple) is a temple complex housing one of the largest jade Buddha statues in the world. Located in Anshan, Liaoning Province, the complex covers 22,104 square metres (237,930 sq ft). It is situated beside Dongshan Scenic Reserve.

The statue was sculpted from a piece of jade 7.95 metres (26.1 ft) high, 6.88 metres (22.6 ft) wide, 4.10 metres (13.5 ft) thick, weighing 260.76 tonnes (574,900 lb). The front of the stone has been carved with an image of Sakyamuni (a.k.a. Gautama) Buddha. On the back of the stone Guanyin (a.k.a. Avalokitesvara) Buddha has been carved. The jade stone was found on 22 July 1960 in Xiuyan County of Anshan which is known as the "hometown of jade" (Xiuyan jade is not really jade, but Serpentinite). It was declared a treasure of the State and listed as a protected property by Chinese Premier Zhou Enlai. Anshan city government commissioned the carving which took a team of 120 sculptors 18 months to complete. The temple complex was opened on 3 September 1996. The building that houses the jade Buddha statue is 33 metres (108 ft) tall, representing the 33 layers of heaven in Buddhism. It claims to be one the tallest buildings of ancient Chinese architectural style in China.
