= HXT =

HXT or Hxt may refer to:

- Haicheng West railway station, the telegraph code
- Hard X-ray Telescope, a Fourier-synthesis X-ray imager
- Hxt, a group of proteins that are largely responsible for the uptake of glucose in yeast
