= Qianshan National Park =

National park in Liaoning, China

- IUCN category II (national park)
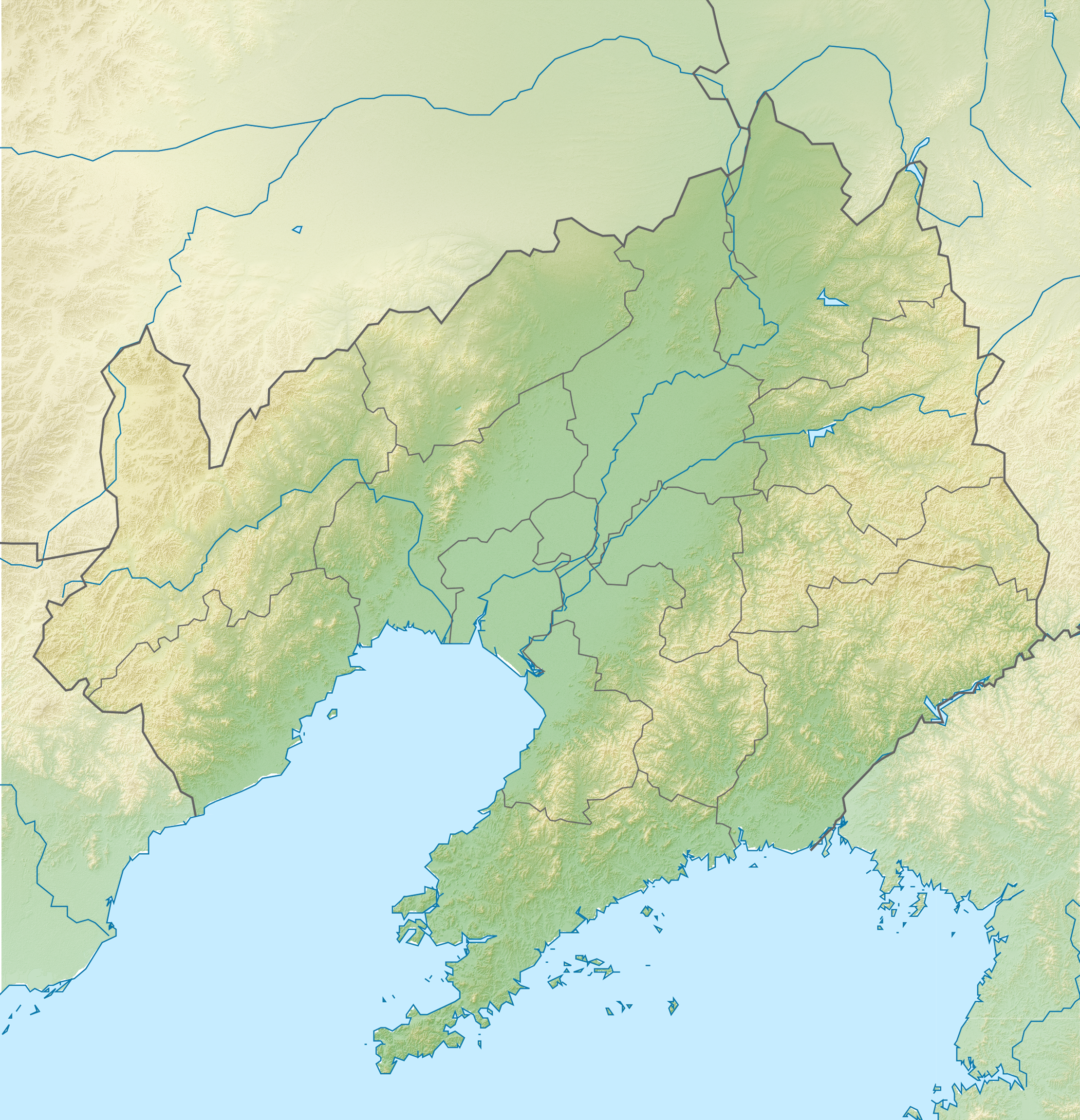
- Location within Liaoning
- Location: Tiedong District, Anshan, Liaoning
- Nearest city: Anshan
- Coordinates: 41°1′35″N 123°8′10″E
- Area: 44 km^{2} (17 sq mi)
- Established: November 8, 1982

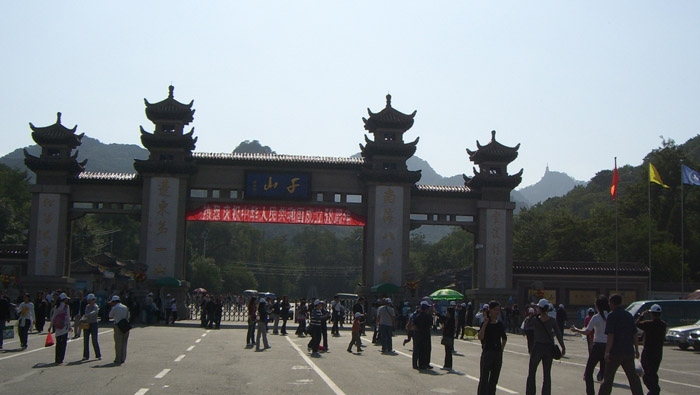
Qianshan National Park (Entrance)

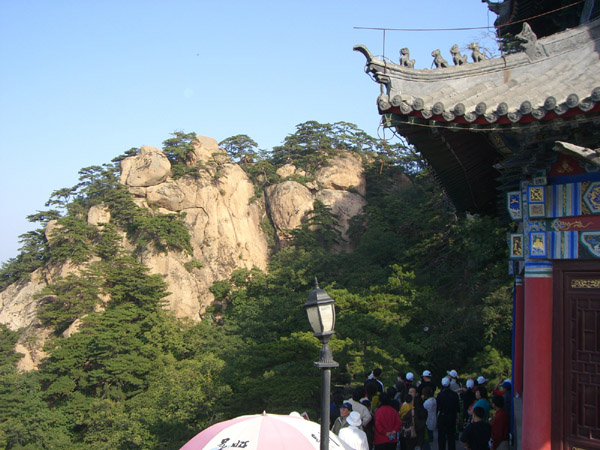
Qianshan National Park (Viewing the Scenery)

Qianshan National Park (simplified Chinese: 千山国家公园; traditional Chinese: 千山國家公園; pinyin: Qiānshān; lit. 'Thousand mountains') is a mountainous national park in Liaoning Province, China, 17 km by road, south east of Anshan. It is in the Qianshan Mountains (Chinese: 千山山脉), named after itself, that extends from the Changbai Mountains in the China-North Korea border, first westward to Liaoyang, then southward to Dalian in the southern corner of Liaoning Province.

== Name origin ==
The park is referred to as 'The Northeast Pearl'. The name Qianshan literally means 'Thousand mountains'. This is actually an abbreviation of the full name, Thousand Lotus Flower Mountains (Chinese: 千朵莲花山; pinyin: qiān duǒ liánhuā shān). According to legend, a long time ago the four corners of the sky collapsed. The Goddess Nüwa wanted to save the people living below so she patched up the sky with stones. One stone was accidentally dropped to the ground where it splashed, throwing the earth into thousands of peaks in the shape of a lotus blossom. Thus Nüwa created Qianshan. The park area of 44 square kilometres, is filled with both Buddhist and Taoist temples, monasteries and nunneries. Here is one of few locations where both religions are found sharing the same site. Among the peaks, a naturally wrought statue of the Buddha stands 70 meters high. It is claimed to be largest naturally occurring image of Maitreya Buddha in the world.

The area has a long history of religious worship dating back to the Tang dynasty of China. The site was enhanced during both Ming and Qing dynasties. The revolutions of the twentieth century saw the site abandoned and some buildings damaged. The park has since been restored and expanded with new Pagoda and temples for the Maitreya Buddha.

At its highest point, Qianshan reaches an elevation of 708.3 metres. The park is densely wooded with 95% of the area covered by forests. Over ten thousand of the pine trees have been estimated to be older than 100 years in age. Rare flora and fauna are found here along with a large number of plants used in traditional Chinese medicines. Over a hundred different species of birds can be observed in the park including the rare black-headed stork.

Motor cars are not allowed within the park. Tourists must either walk or hire one of the electric carts. Many paved footpaths climb steeply up the hillsides through thick forest. These footpaths lead past stelae honouring the dead, small shrines, pagodas and temples. Three cable car routes connect to several of the park's scenic peaks. However, none of the cable cars go the whole way up, leaving visitors some climbing if they wish to attain the summit.

Among Qianshan's scenic spots is a new discovery – a mountain which has been shaped by nature in such a way that it resembles the Maitreya Buddha. The Buddha stands 70 metres high and 46 metres wide and is claimed to be the largest naturally occurring image of Maitreya Buddha in the world. Several temples have been built on the peaks overlooking the Maitreya Buddha. These include: The Pagoda of Maitreya, Great Buddha Temple, Pavilion of Buddha, Greeting Gate, Holographic Buddhist Character and Tachibana Hoxdox. The park has become the venue for the Qianshan Great Buddha Festival in June every year.

== Image gallery ==
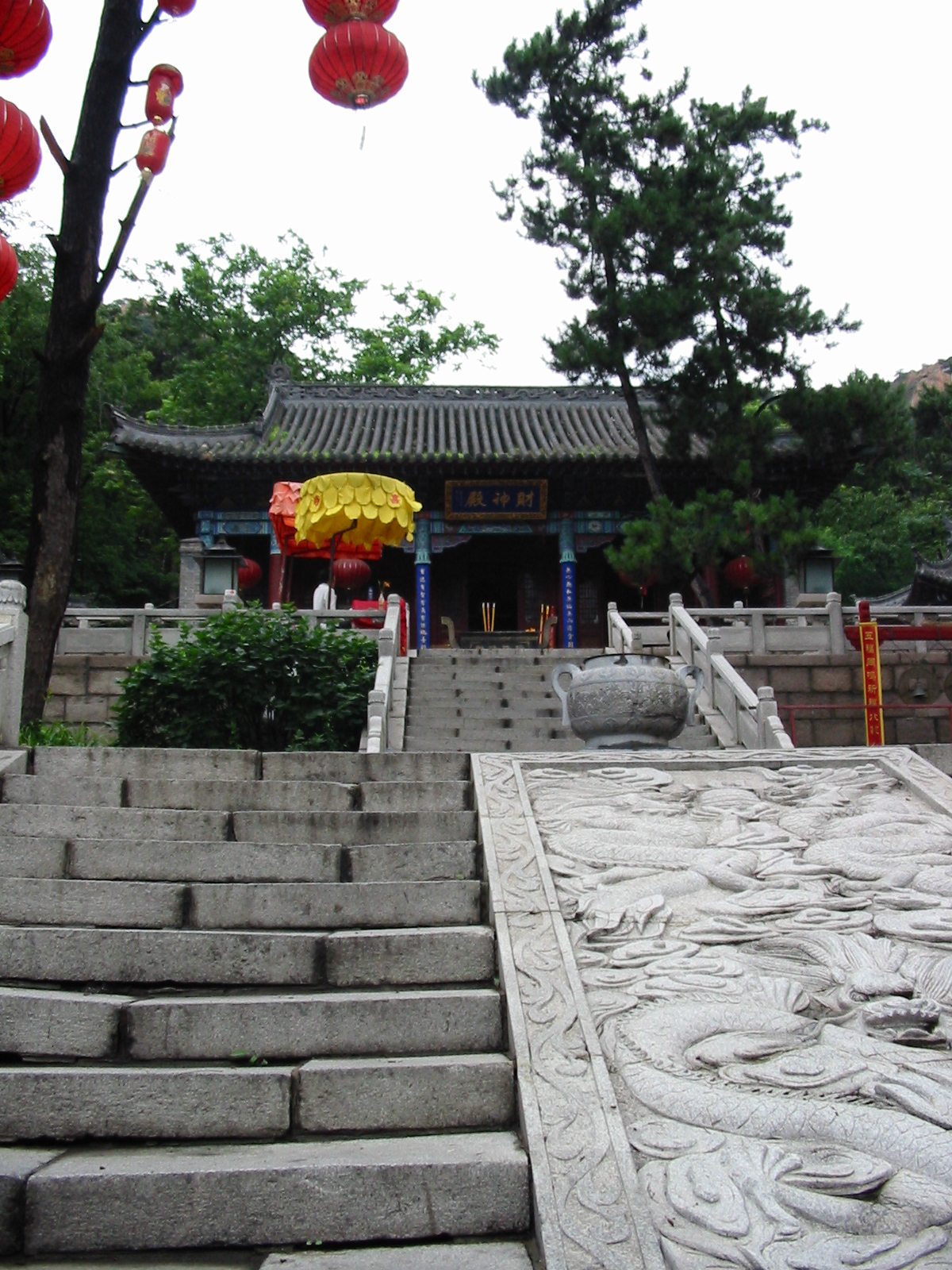

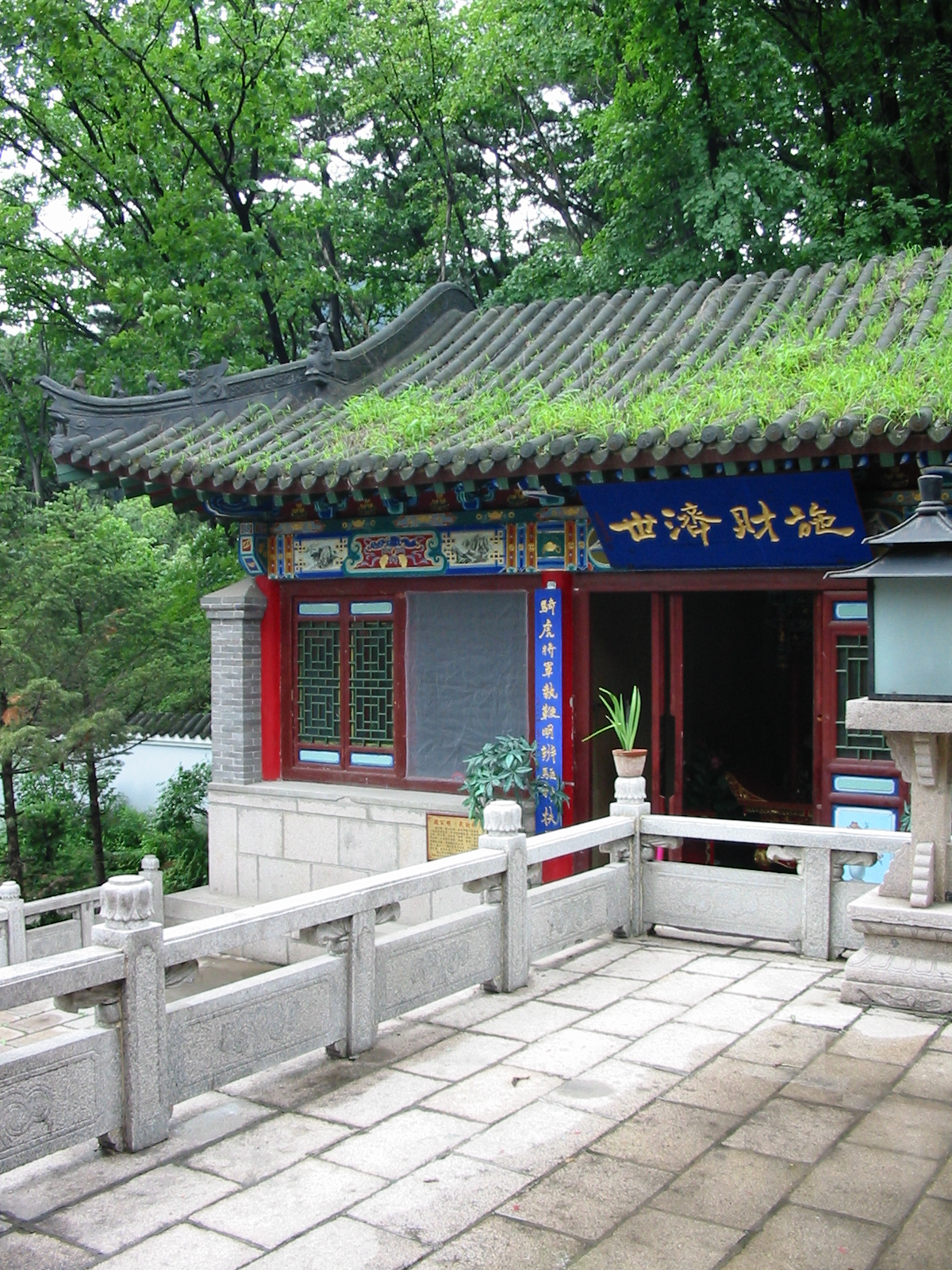

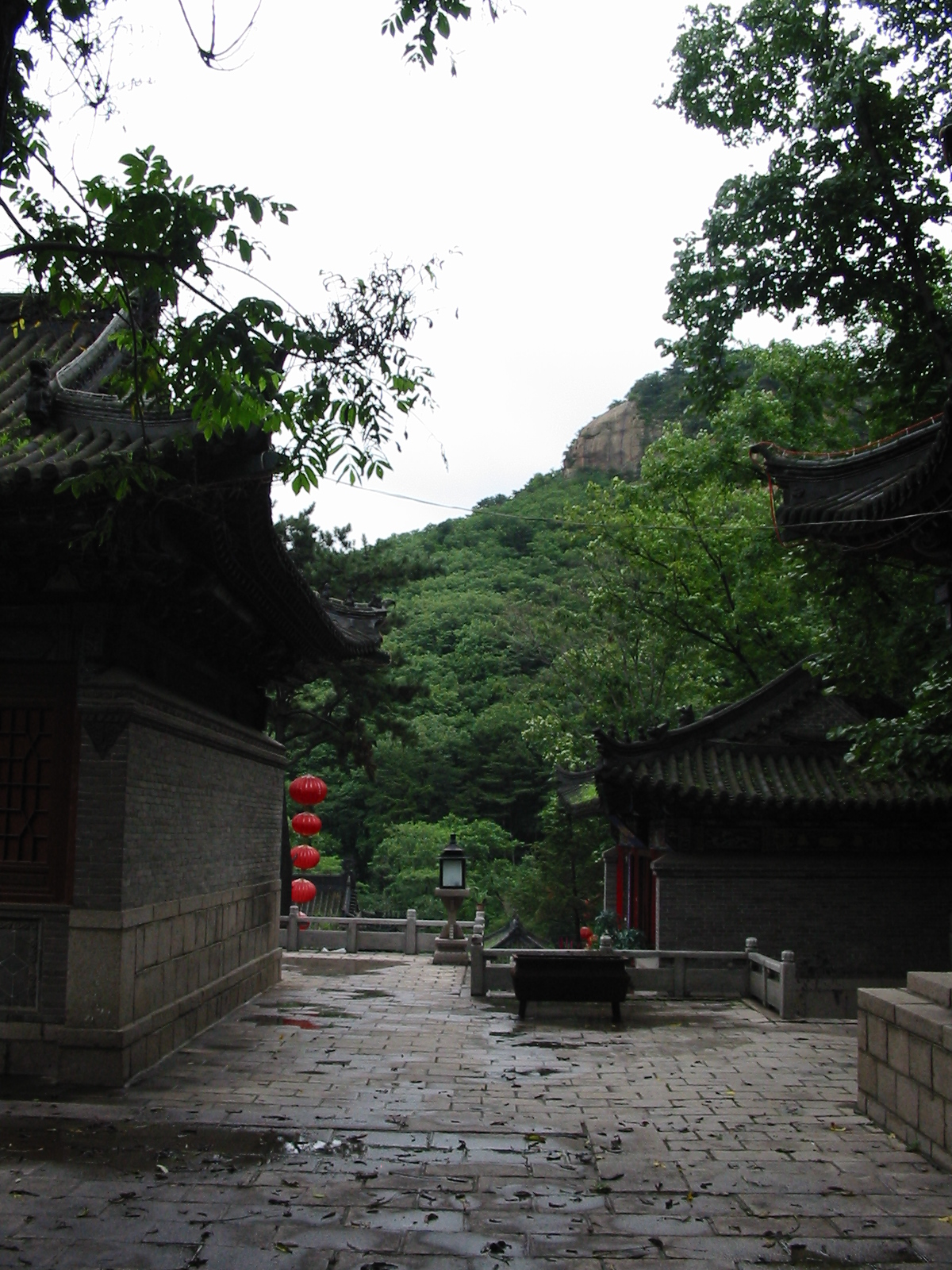

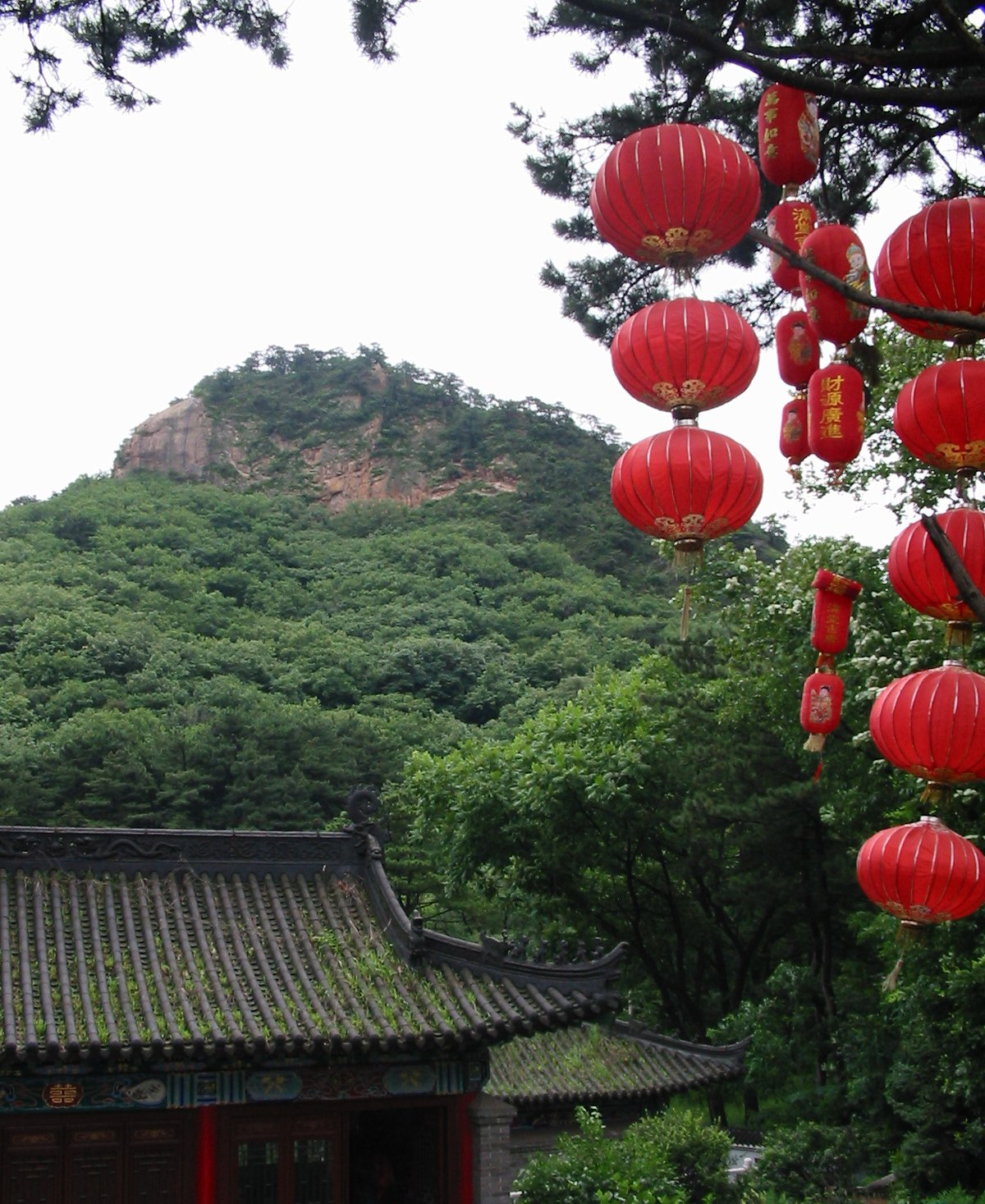

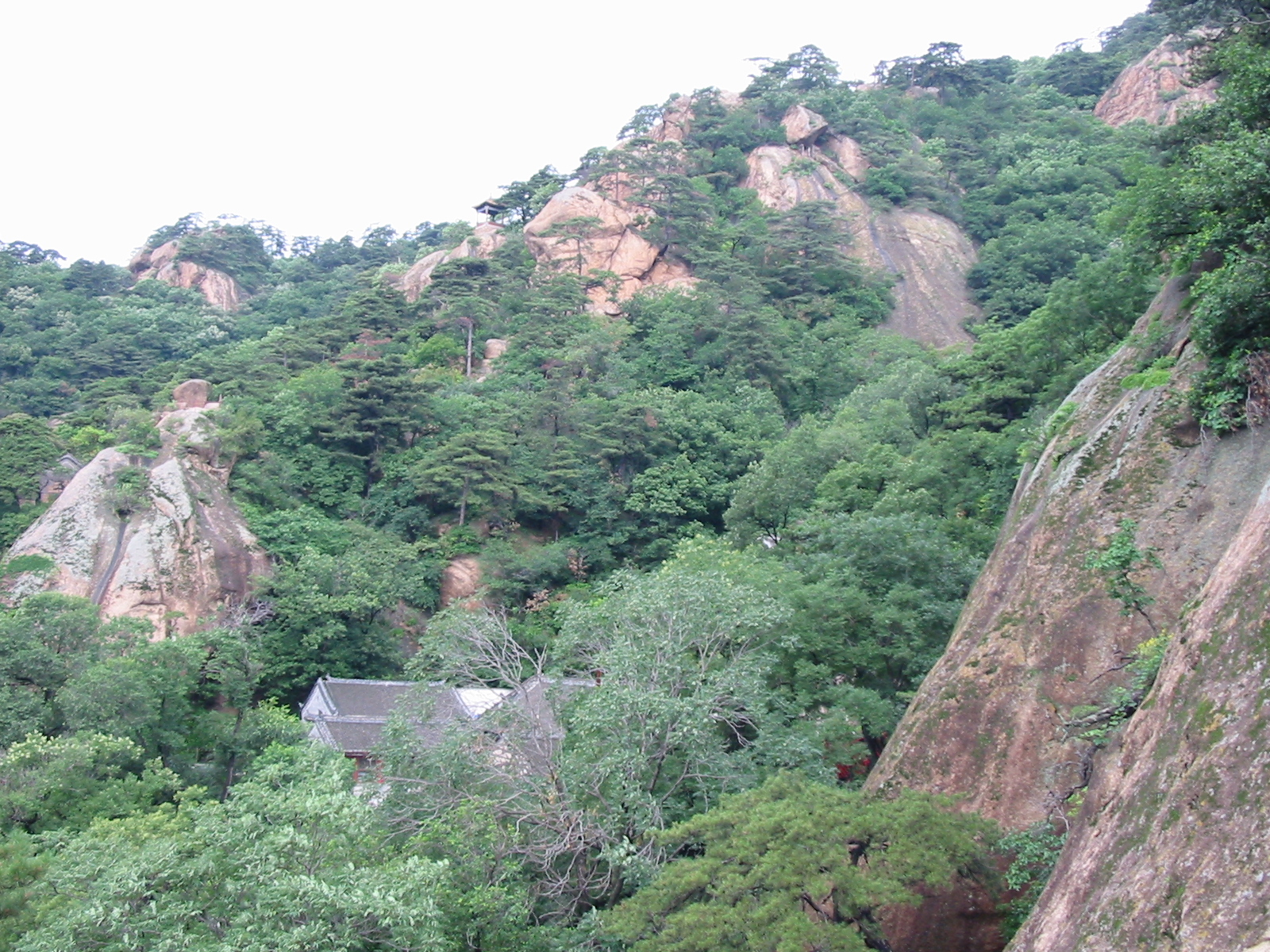

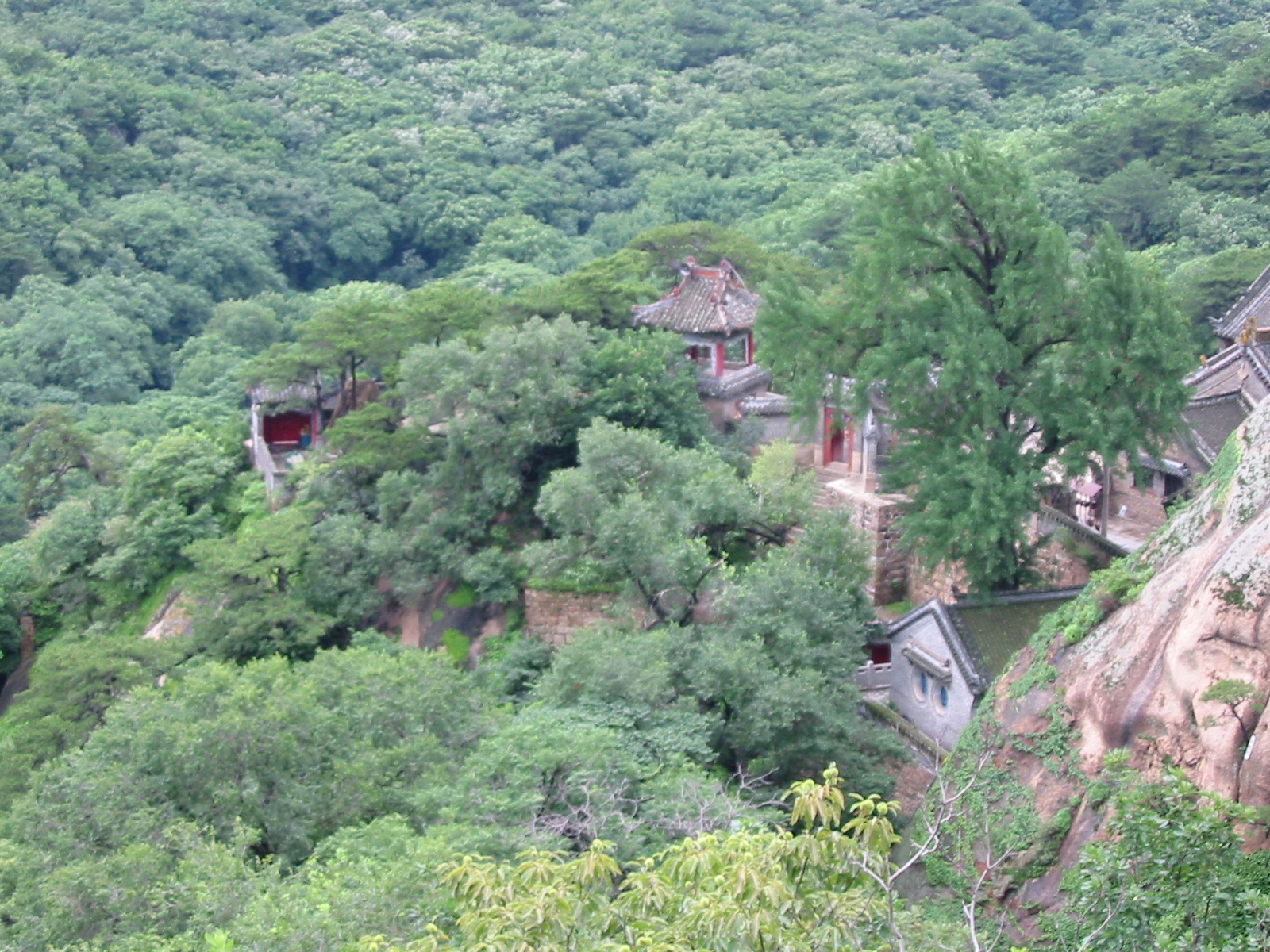
