= HCX =

HCX may refer to:

- .hcx, the filename extension for BinHex
- Haicheng West railway station, the pinyin code HCX
- HCX, a Spectrum clone developed at the Technical University of Magdeburg
