= Lishan District =

Coordinates: 41°08′30″N 123°01′00″E

Lishan 立山区
- District
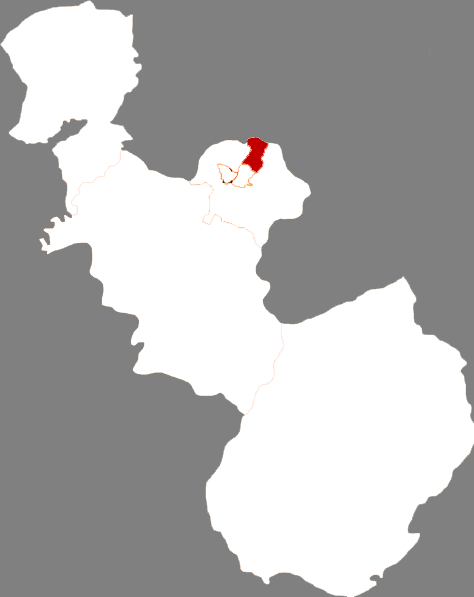
- Location in Anshan
- Country: People's Republic of China
- Province: Liaoning
- Prefecture-level city: Anshan

Area
  - Total: 55 km^{2} (21 sq mi)

Population (2020 census)
  - Total: 529,275
  - Density: 9,600/km^{2} (25,000/sq mi)
- Time zone: UTC+08:00 (China Standard)
- Postal code: 114031
- Website: www.lishan.gov.cn

Lishan District (simplified Chinese: 立山区; traditional Chinese: 立山區; pinyin: Lìshān Qū) is a district of Anshan City, Liaoning, People's Republic of China.

== Administrative divisions ==
There are eight subdistricts and one town.

Subdistricts:

- Lishan Subdistrict (立山街道)
- Youhao Subdistrict (友好街道)
- Shuangshan District (双山街道)
- Shuguang Subdistrict (曙光街道)
- Lingshan Subdistrict (灵山街道)
- Shenbei Subdistrict (深北街道)
- Shennan Subdistrict (深南街道)
- Shahe Subdistrict (沙河街道)

The only town is Shahe (沙河镇)
