= Tiexi District, Anshan =

Tiexi District 铁西区
- District
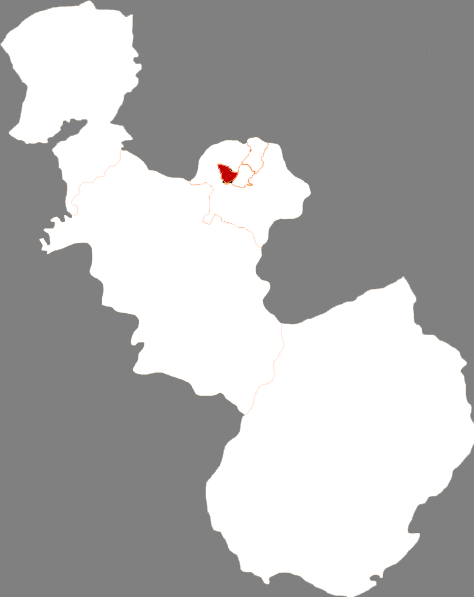
- Tiexi in Anshan

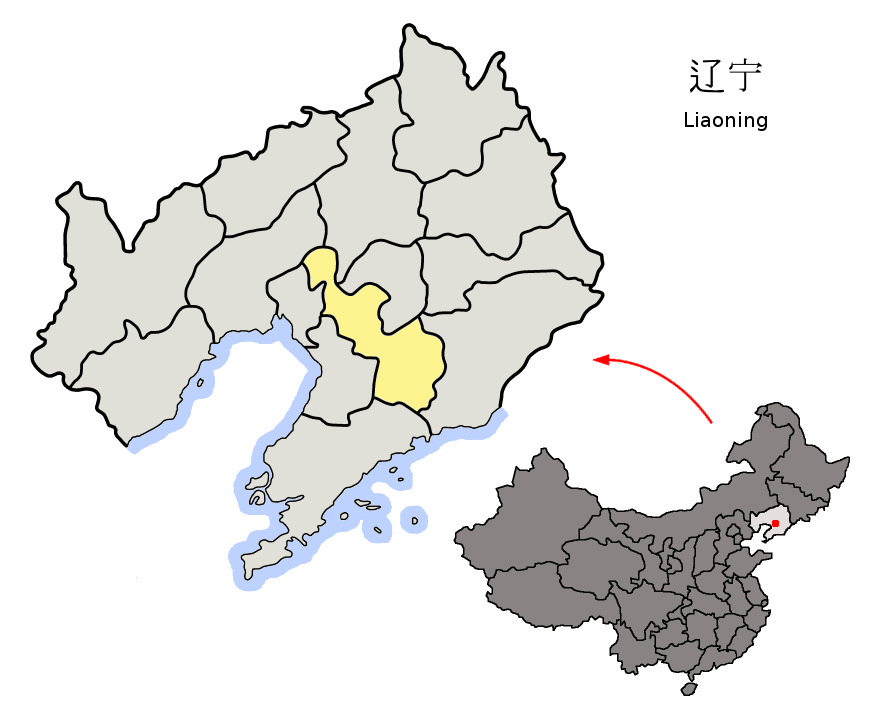
- Anshan in Liaoning
- Coordinates: 41°07′12″N 122°58′11″E
- Country: People's Republic of China
- Province: Liaoning
- Prefecture-level city: Anshan

Area
  - Total: 142.8 km^{2} (55.1 sq mi)

Population (2020 census)
  - Total: 408,118
  - Density: 2,858/km^{2} (7,402/sq mi)
- Time zone: UTC+8 (China Standard)

Tiexi District (simplified Chinese: 铁西区; traditional Chinese: 鐵西區; pinyin: Tiěxī Qū; lit. 'railroad west district'), is located in the southwest of Anshan, Liaoning province, China.

The main plant of Anshan Steel limited company is in this district. The Technology developing district is also here.

== Administrative divisions ==
There are 11 subdistricts.

Subdistricts:

- Yongle Subdistrict (永乐街道)
- Gonghe Subdistrict (共和街道)
- Xingsheng Subdistrict (兴盛街道)
- Bajiazi Subdistrict (八家子街道)
- Qiming Subdistrict (启明街道)
- Fanrong Subdistrict (繁荣街道)
- Xintao Subdistrict (新陶街道)
- Dalu Subdistrict (大陆街道)
- Beitaoguan Subdistrict (北陶官街道)
- Nanhua Subdistrict (南华街道)
- Yongfa Subdistrict (永发街道)
