= Qianshan District =

Coordinates: 41°03′59″N 122°57′15″E

Qianshan 千山区
- District
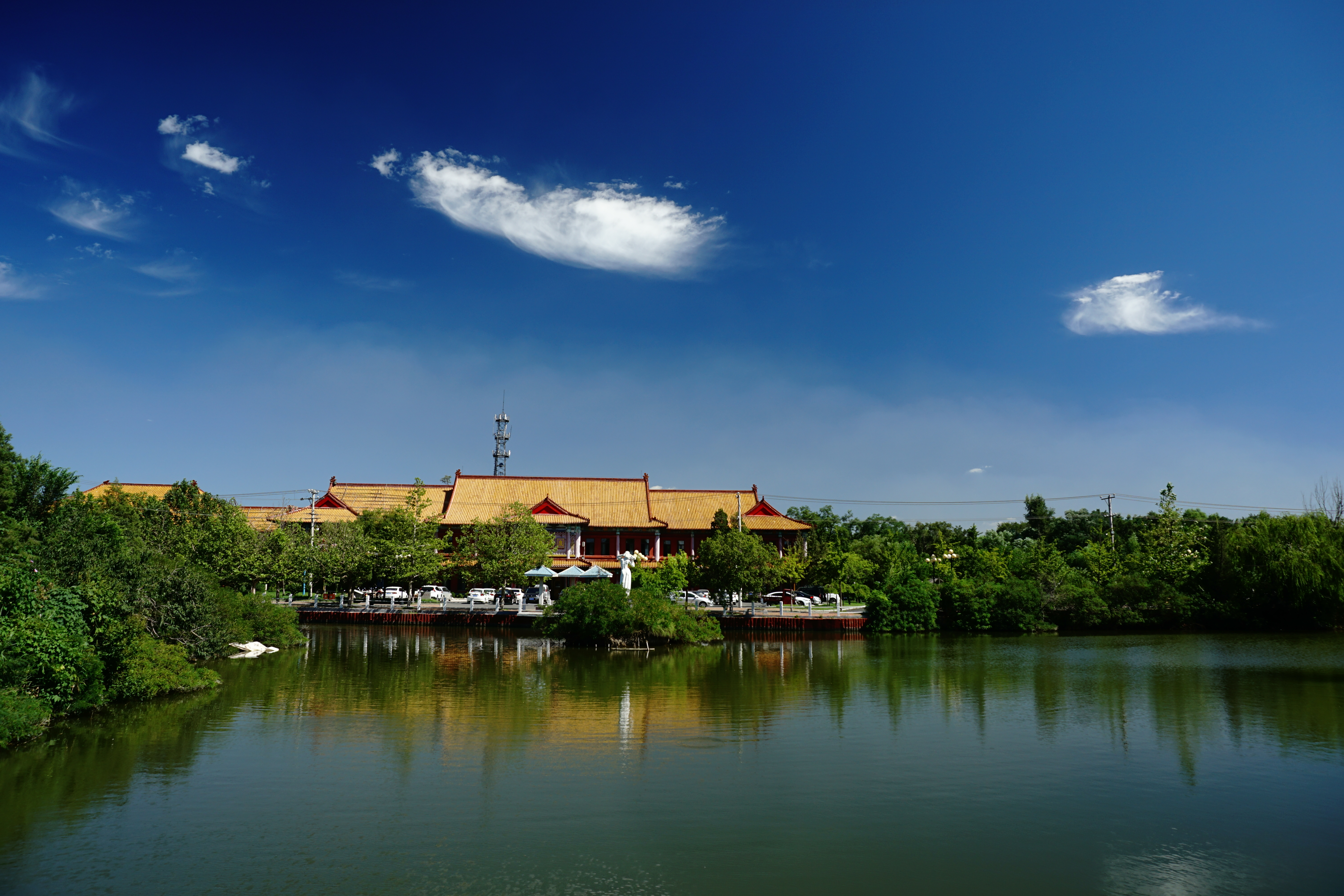

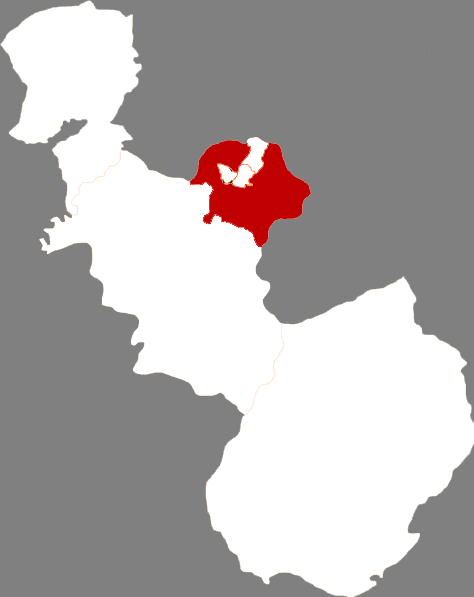
- Qianshan in Anshan

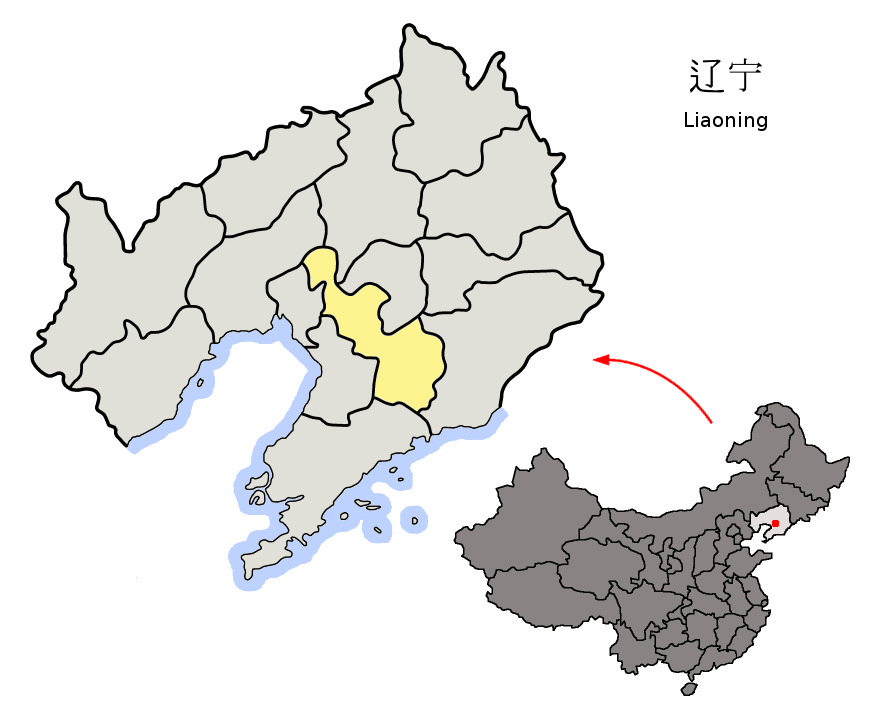
- Anshan in Liaoning
- Country: People's Republic of China
- Province: Liaoning
- Prefecture-level city: Anshan

Area
  - Total: 329.0 km^{2} (127.0 sq mi)

Population (2020 census)
  - Total: 94,729
  - Density: 287.9/km^{2} (745.7/sq mi)
- Time zone: UTC+8 (China Standard)

Qianshan District (simplified Chinese: 千山区; traditional Chinese: 千山區; pinyin: Qiānshān Qū; lit. 'Thousand Mountain') is a district of the city of Anshan, Liaoning province, People's Republic of China.

== Administrative divisions ==
There are two subdistricts and seven towns.

Subdistricts:

- Jiupu Subdistrict (旧堡街道)
- Dagushan Subdistrict (大孤山街道)

Towns:

- East Anshan (东鞍山镇)
- Tangjiafang (唐家房镇)
- Dagushan (大孤山镇)
- Qianshan Town (千山镇)
- Qidashan (齐大山镇)
- Songsantaizi (宋三台子镇)
- Ningyuan (宁远镇)
