= Anshan Normal University =

University in Anshan, Liaoning, China

Coordinates: 41°04′34″N 122°59′46″E

- 鞍山师范学院
- Motto: 博雅兼上 知行合一
- Type: Public
- Established: 1958 - Reestablished in 1978
- Academic staff: 1,207
- Location: Anshan, Liaoning, People's Republic of China
- Campus: Multiple Suburban
- Website: https://web.archive.org/web/20060316040721/http://www.asnc.edu.cn/

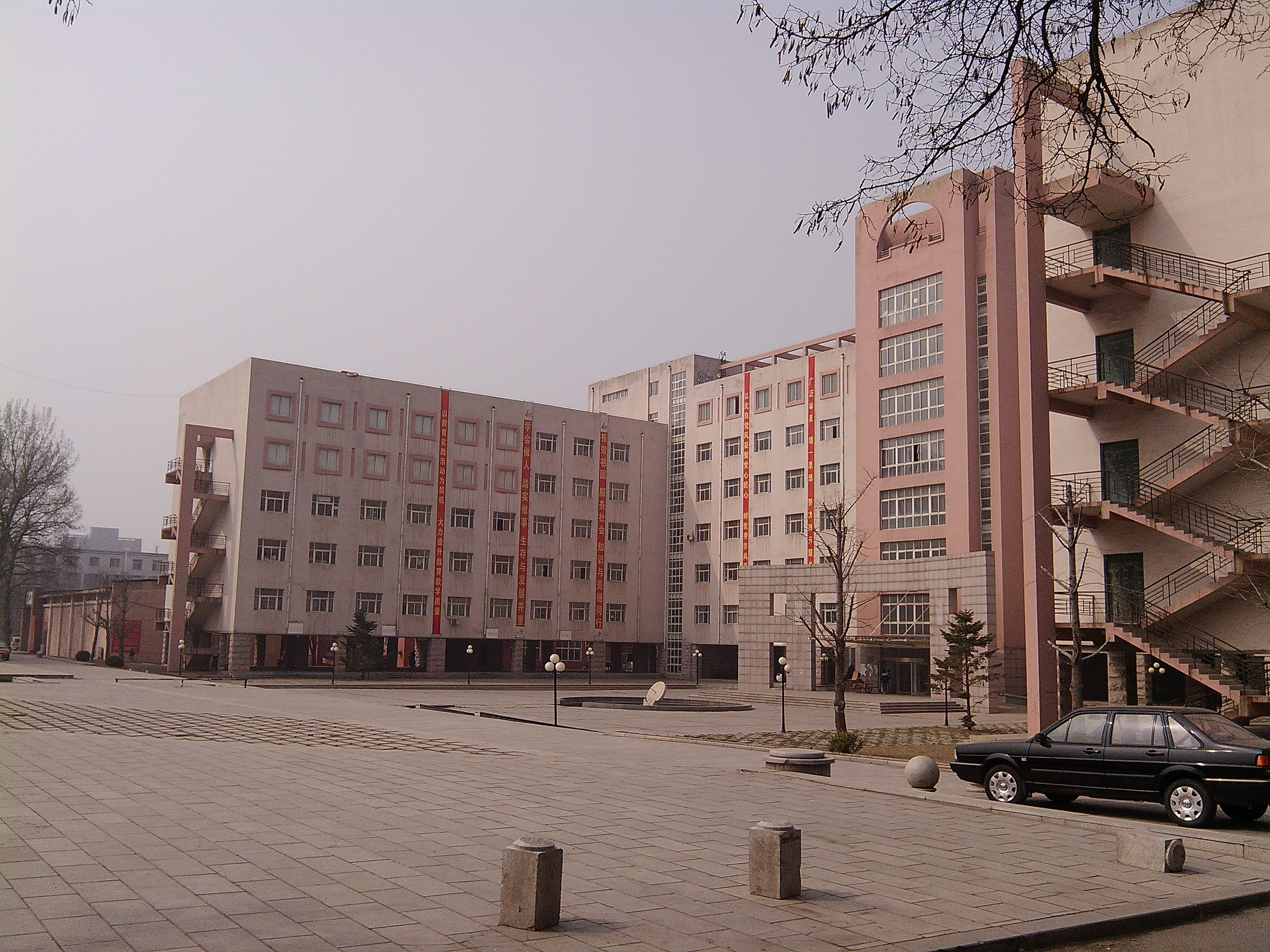
Anshan Normal University teaching buildings

Anshan Normal University (simplified Chinese: 鞍山师范学院; traditional Chinese: 鞍山師範學院; pinyin: Ānshān Shīfàn Xuéyuàn) is a university in the city of Anshan, in Liaoning province. It is under the provincial government. The school was founded in 1958 as a teacher training centre but suspended all operations in 1962 at the dawn of the Chinese Cultural Revolution before it was restarted again in 1978. The campus covers an area of 731,600 square meters. There is a teaching staff of 1207 over various levels from Professor down to post graduate teachers.
