= Xiuyan Manchu Autonomous County =

Xiuyan 岫岩县 ᠰᡳᡠᠶᠠᠨ ᠰᡳᠶᠠᠨ Siuyen
- Autonomous county
- 岫岩满族自治县 ᠰᡳᡠᠶᠠᠨ ᠮᠠᠨᠵᡠ ᠪᡝᠶᡝ ᡩᠠᠰᠠᠩᡤᠠ ᠰᡳᠶᠠᠨ; Xiuyan Manchu Autonomous County
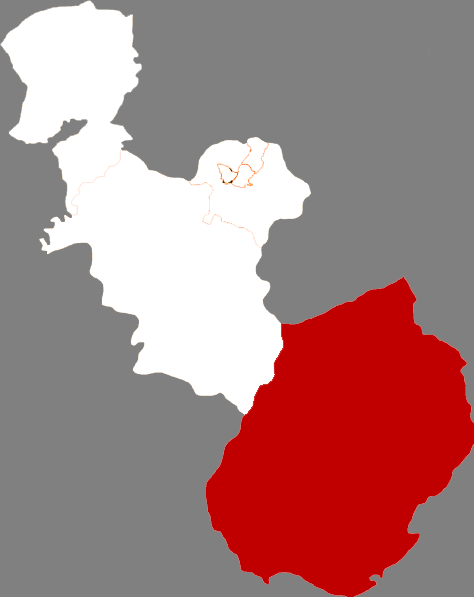
- Xiuyan in Anshan

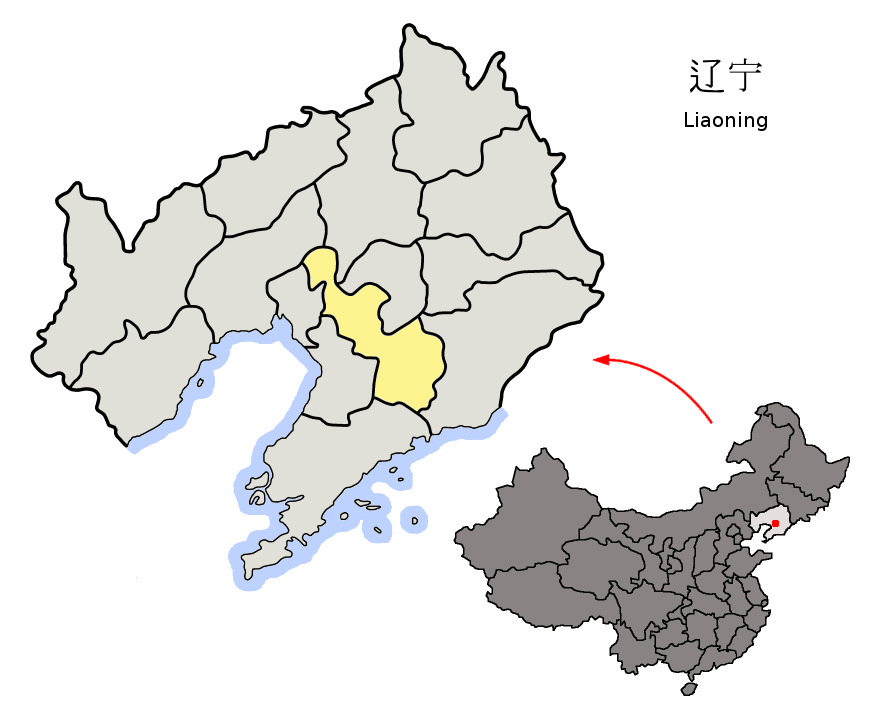
- Anshan in Liaoning
- Coordinates: 40°17′28″N 123°16′52″E
- Country: China
- Province: Liaoning
- Prefecture-level city: Anshan
- County seat: Fuchang Subdistrict

Area
  - Total: 4,502 km^{2} (1,738 sq mi)
- Elevation: 79.6 m (261 ft)

Population (2020 census)
  - Total: 413,007
  - Density: 91.74/km^{2} (237.6/sq mi)
- Time zone: UTC+8 (China Standard)
- Postal code: 114300
- Website: www.xiuyan.gov.cn

Xiuyan Manchu Autonomous County (simplified Chinese: 岫岩满族自治县; traditional Chinese: 岫巖滿族自治縣; pinyin: Xiùyán Mǎnzú Zìzhìxiàn; Manchu: ᠰᡳᡠᠶᠠᠨ ᠮᠠᠨᠵᡠ ᠪᡝᠶᡝ ᡩᠠᠰᠠᠩᡤᠠ ᠰᡳᠶᠠᠨ, Möllendorff: siuyan manju beye dasangga siyan) is a county in the southeast of Liaoning province, China, and is also one of the 11 Manchu autonomous counties and one of 117 autonomous counties nationally. It is under the administration of and occupies the southernmost portion of Anshan, the centre of which 136 kilometres (85 mi) to the north-northwest, and has a population of 413,000 in 2020.

== Administrative divisions ==
There are 3 subdistricts, 18 towns and 3 townships under the county's administration.

3 subdistricts

- Fuchang Subdistrict (阜昌街道)
- Xinglong Subdistrict (兴隆街道)
- Yahe Subdistrict (雅河街道)

18 towns

- Sanjiazi (三家子镇)
- Shimiaozi (石庙子镇)
- Huanghuadian (黄花甸镇)
- Dayingzi (大营子镇)
- Suzigou (苏子沟镇)
- Pianling (偏岭镇)
- Hadabei (哈达碑镇)
- Xindian (新甸镇)
- Yanghe (洋河镇)
- Yangjiabao (杨家堡镇)
- Qingliangshan (清凉山镇)
- Shihuiyao (石灰窑镇)
- Qianying (前营子镇)
- Longtan (龙潭镇)
- Muniu (牧牛镇)
- Yaoshan (药山镇)
- Dafangshen (大房身镇)
- Chaoyang (朝阳镇)

3 townships

- Hongqiyingzi Township (红旗营子乡)
- Linggou Township (岭沟乡)
- Shaozihe Township (哨子河乡)

== Geography and climate ==
Xiuyan borders Yingkou and Gaizhou to the west, Donggang and Zhuanghe to the south and Haicheng and Liaoyang to the north. Its latitude ranges from 40° 00' to 40° 39' N and longitude 122° 52' to 123° 41' E, and the area is 4,507 km^{2} (1,740 sq mi). The county's area is dominated by low-lying mountains part of the Changbai Mountains, with the highest peak in the county, Mount Maokui (帽盔山), at 1,141.5 m (3,745 ft), being the highest point in southern Liaoning.

Xiuyan has a monsoon-influenced humid continental climate (Köppen Dwa) characterised by hot, humid summers, due to the monsoon, and rather long, cold, and very dry winters, due to the Siberian anticyclone. The four seasons here are distinctive. A majority of the annual rainfall occurs in July and August. The monthly 24-hour average temperatures ranges from −9.8 °C (14.4 °F) in January to 23.3 °C (73.9 °F) in July, while the annual mean is 8.2 °C (46.8 °F). Due to the mountainous location, temperatures tend to be slightly cooler than areas to the south and west, and summer rainfall is more generous.

Climate data for Xiuyan, elevation 98 m (322 ft), (1991–2020 normals, extremes 1971–2025)
Month	Jan	Feb	Mar	Apr	May	Jun	Jul	Aug	Sep	Oct	Nov	Dec	Year
Record high °C (°F)	10.6 (51.1)	13.5 (56.3)	26.3 (79.3)	30.4 (86.7)	33.5 (92.3)	37.6 (99.7)	37.7 (99.9)	36.4 (97.5)	36.3 (97.3)	29.4 (84.9)	20.0 (68.0)	11.7 (53.1)	37.7 (99.9)
Mean daily maximum °C (°F)	−2.4 (27.7)	1.7 (35.1)	8.1 (46.6)	16.5 (61.7)	22.7 (72.9)	26.1 (79.0)	28.1 (82.6)	28.7 (83.7)	24.8 (76.6)	17.3 (63.1)	7.3 (45.1)	−0.9 (30.4)	14.8 (58.7)
Daily mean °C (°F)	−9.5 (14.9)	−5.2 (22.6)	1.5 (34.7)	9.5 (49.1)	15.9 (60.6)	20.4 (68.7)	23.6 (74.5)	23.3 (73.9)	17.5 (63.5)	9.7 (49.5)	0.8 (33.4)	−7.3 (18.9)	8.4 (47.0)
Mean daily minimum °C (°F)	−14.9 (5.2)	−10.9 (12.4)	−4.0 (24.8)	3.0 (37.4)	9.6 (49.3)	15.5 (59.9)	20.0 (68.0)	19.2 (66.6)	11.9 (53.4)	3.7 (38.7)	−4.2 (24.4)	−12.3 (9.9)	3.0 (37.5)
Record low °C (°F)	−31.6 (−24.9)	−28.9 (−20.0)	−16.8 (1.8)	−7.4 (18.7)	0.1 (32.2)	7.0 (44.6)	11.7 (53.1)	7.3 (45.1)	−0.5 (31.1)	−9.3 (15.3)	−18.8 (−1.8)	−25.3 (−13.5)	−31.6 (−24.9)
Average precipitation mm (inches)	4.6 (0.18)	10.3 (0.41)	14.9 (0.59)	40.9 (1.61)	63.5 (2.50)	95.2 (3.75)	183.8 (7.24)	226.2 (8.91)	67.6 (2.66)	39.3 (1.55)	26.0 (1.02)	9.5 (0.37)	781.8 (30.79)
Average precipitation days (≥ 0.1 mm)	3.1	3.3	4.5	7.0	8.9	11.1	13.7	11.3	6.8	6.4	6.0	4.1	86.2
Average snowy days	5.3	4.8	3.8	1.1	0	0	0	0	0	0.2	4.5	6.2	25.9
Average relative humidity (%)	60	58	58	58	66	77	85	84	78	71	67	64	69
Mean monthly sunshine hours	182.1	179.3	216.5	213.3	230.1	175.9	133.2	170.7	202.9	194.5	157.1	158.0	2,213.6
Percentage possible sunshine	61	59	58	53	51	39	29	40	55	57	53	55	51
Source 1: China Meteorological Administration
Source 2: Weather China
