= University of Science and Technology Liaoning =

University in China

University of Science and Technology Liaoning located in Anshan City, Liaoning Province, is the earliest metallurgical University established in China. Originally a university directly under the Ministry of metallurgy, it is a first-class key university in Liaoning Province. It has been selected into the "excellent engineer education and training program" of the Ministry of Education, "national new engineering research and practice project", Chinese government scholarship institutions for overseas students in China, hundred school projects Liaoning provincial credit system management pilot University and Liaoning Provincial transformation and development pilot school, with the right to promote graduate students and the National University Science and Technology Park, is a multidisciplinary university focusing on engineering, covering engineering, science, economics, management, literature, law, art, and other disciplines.

Founded in 1948, the university was upgraded to Anshan Iron and Steel Institute in 1958. It began to recruit postgraduates in 1980 and obtained the right to confer a master's degree in 1983. In 2002, it was renamed Anshan University of science and technology. In 2006, it was renamed Liaoning University of Science and Technology, and became the doctoral degree awarding unit in the same year.

As of February 2021, the school covers an area of more than 1.84 million square meters; There are 19 colleges and 59 undergraduate majors; There are 3 first-class discipline doctoral programs, 13 second-class discipline doctoral programs, 14 first-class discipline master programs, 47 second-class discipline master programs, and 8 professional degree master programs. Liaoning University of science and technology has national key undergraduate disciplines, such as metallurgical engineering, inorganic non-metallic material engineering, automation, and network engineering. The department of computer and software engineering was rated as the key computer science department of Liaoning Province. The software engineering field ranks top 60 to 80 in China according to the Ministry of Education evaluation.

== History ==
The university was originally conceived in 1948 as the Anshan Institute of Iron and Steel (simplified Chinese: 鞍山钢铁学院; traditional Chinese: 鞍山鋼鐵學院).

In 1958, the university was established as Anshan Institute of Iron and Steel Technology (AIIST) and placed under the administration of the Ministry of Metallurgical Industry of the Chinese central government.

In 1994, the Anshan Advanced Vocational College was merged into AIIST.

In 1998, the oversight of AIIST was transferred from Ministry of Metallurgical Industry to the government of Liaoning Province.

In 1999, Liaoning College of Food Industry, Liaoning College of Metallurgical Industry and Liaoning College of Construction Material Industry and their campuses were incorporated into AIIST.

In 2002, AIIST changed its name to Anshan University of Science and Technology (ASUST).

The university took its current name in 2006, when the Ministry of Education of the People's Republic of China approved the restructure of Anshan University of Science and Technology to University of Science and Technology Liaoning.

== Administration ==
The university has 15 faculties (schools or departments). It provides 35 undergraduate programs, 11 high-level special professional programs, and 35 graduate programs.

There are 18,000 students enrolled.
