= Owen =

Owen may refer to:

== People and fictional characters ==
- Owen (name), including a list of people and fictional characters with the given name or surname

== Places ==
=== United States ===
- Owen, Missouri, a ghost town
- Owen, Wisconsin
- Owen County, Indiana
- Owen County, Kentucky
- Owen Township (disambiguation)
- Mount Owen (Colorado)
- Mount Owen (Wyoming)

=== Elsewhere ===
- Owen Island, South Shetland Islands, Antarctica
- Owen Sound, a city in Ontario, Canada
- Owen, South Australia, a small town
- Owen, Germany, town in Baden-Württemberg
- Mount Owen (disambiguation)
- Port Owen, South Africa

== Ships ==
- USS Owen (DD-536), a destroyer that took part in World War II and the Korean War
- HMS Owen (K640), a British Royal Navy frigate

== Other uses ==
- Owen (automobile), an American car made from 1910 to 1912
- Owen (musician), a solo project of American indie rock singer-songwriter Mike Kinsella
  - Owen (album), a 2001 album
- Owen (hippopotamus), a young orphan hippopotamus who formed a bond with a giant tortoise
- Owen gun, an Australian World War II submachine gun
- Owen Graduate School of Management, the graduate business school of Vanderbilt University

== See also ==
- Owen fracture zone, a transform fault which runs along the eastern boundary of the Arabian plate, separating it from the Indo-Australian plate
- Owen Owen, UK department store chain
- D.R. Owen (shipwreck), a schooner that was shipwrecked in Lake Superior in 1874
- Owen's (disambiguation)
- Owens (disambiguation)
- Eógan (given name), pronounced Owen, Irish-Scottish version of the given name
- Owain (disambiguation)
