= Xishi =

Xishi may refer to:

- Xishi District (西市区), Yingkou, Liaoning
- Xishi, Fuxing (西勢村), village in Fuxing, Changhua County, Taiwan
- Xi Shi (西施; c. 506 BC – ?), one of the renowned Four Beauties of ancient China
