= Yingkou Lanqi Airport =

Airport in Liaoning, China

Yingkou Lanqi Airport 营口兰旗机场
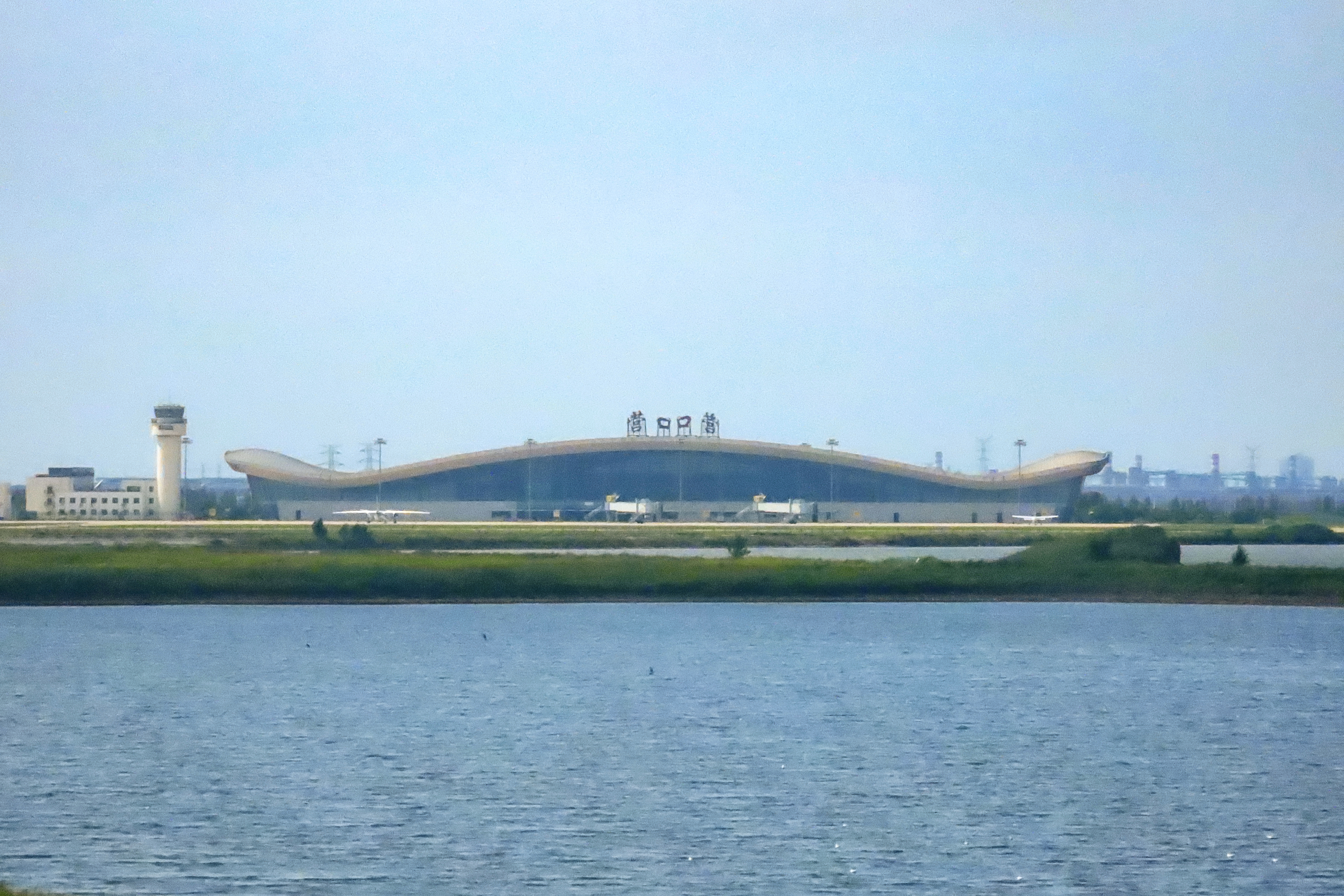
- IATA: YKH; ICAO: ZYYK

Summary
- Airport type: Public
- Operator: HNA Infrastructure Investment Group
- Serves: Yingkou, Liaoning, China
- Location: East of Lanqi Village, Laobian District
- Opened: 3 February 2016; 10 years ago
- Elevation AMSL: 0 m / 0 ft
- Coordinates: 40°32′27″N 122°21′26″E

Map
- Location of airport in Liaoning

Runways
Direction	Length		Surface
Direction	m	ft	Surface
04/22	2,500	8,202	Concrete

Statistics (2021)
- Passengers: 151,526
- Aircraft movements: 1,899
- Cargo (metric tons): 801.3

Yingkou Lanqi Airport
- Simplified Chinese: 营口兰旗机场
- Traditional Chinese: 營口蘭旗機場
Transcriptions
Standard Mandarin
- Hanyu Pinyin: Yíngkǒu Lánqí Jīchǎng

Yingkou Lanqi Airport (IATA: YKH, ICAO: ZYYK) is an airport serving the city of Yingkou in Liaoning province of Northeast China. It is located in Lanqi Village in Xishi District of Yingkou, about 17 kilometres (11 mi) from the city center by road. The airport opened on 3 February 2016, when the inaugural China Eastern Airlines flight landed from Shanghai Pudong International Airport. The total investment for the project was estimated at CNY 8.94 billion.

== Facilities ==
The airport has a runway that is 2,500 metres (8,200 ft) long and 45 metres (148 ft) wide (class 4C). It has a 10,000-square-metre (110,000 sq ft) terminal building and six aircraft parking aprons. It is designed to handle 750,000 passengers and 4,130 tons of cargo annually by 2020.

== Airlines and destinations ==
Airlines	Destinations
9 Air	Guangzhou, Wuxi
Juneyao Air	Nanjing, Shanghai–Pudong
Tianjin Airlines	Shijiazhuang

== See also ==
- List of airports in China
- List of the busiest airports in China
