= List of shipwrecks in September 1874 =

The list of shipwrecks in September 1874 includes ships sunk, foundered, grounded, or otherwise lost during September 1874.

== 1 September ==
List of shipwrecks: 1 September 1874
Ship	State	Description
Blixten	(Russian Empire) Grand Duchy of Finland	The steamship ran aground at Loviisa. She was on a voyage from Vyborg to Helsinki.
Catherine	United Kingdom	The schooner sprang a leak and was beached at Campbeltown, Argyllshire.
Eclair	(United Kingdom of Great Britain and Ireland) Guernsey	The brig was wrecked on the Longships, Cornwall the loss of six of her seven crew. Her captain was the only survivor. She was on a voyage from Drobak, Norway to Dublin.
Emu	United Kingdom	The steamship ran aground at Whitby, Yorkshire. She was on a voyage from Whitby to West Hartlepool, County Durham.
Excelsior	United Kingdom	The brig was driven ashore in the River Carron. She was on a voyage from Grangemouth, Stirlingshire to Kronstadt, Russia.
L. G. E.	France	The schooner struck a rock and sank at Les Sables-d'Olonne, Vendée. She was on a voyage from Swansea, Glamorgan, United Kingdom to Les Sable-d'Olonne.
Prosperity	United Kingdom	The sloop was driven ashore and wrecked near the Corsewall Lighthouse, Wigtownshire. Her crew survived. She was on a voyage from Stranraer, Wigtownshire to Troon, Ayrshire.
Star of the Sea	United Kingdom	The ship ran aground on the Pladdies, off Donaghadee, County Down. She was on a voyage from Ayr to Dublin. She was refloated and found to be leaky.
Socrates	Greece	The brig was driven ashore at the Mumbles, Glamorgan. She was on a voyage from the west coast of Africa to Havre de Grâce, Seine-Inférieure, France.

== 2 September ==
List of shipwrecks: 2 September 1874
Ship	State	Description
Evangeline	France	The schooner collided with an American vessel and sank in the English Channel off Start Point, Devon, United Kingdom. Her crew were rescued by a German vessel. Evangeline was on a voyage from Newcastle upon Tyne, Northumberland, United Kingdom to Seville, Spain.
Julia	United Kingdom	The ship departed from New York for Liverpool, Lancashire. No further trace, presumed foundered with the loss of all hands.
Thor	Norway	The brig was abandoned 1 nautical mile (1.9 km) off "Skero". Her crew survived. She was on a voyage from Bo'ness, Lothian, United Kingdom to a Norwegian port.
Unnamed	United Kingdom	A schooner was driven ashore and wrecked on Bardsey Island, Pembrokeshire. Her crew were rescued.

== 3 September ==
List of shipwrecks: 3 September 1874
Ship	State	Description
Asia	United Kingdom	The ship departed from Newcastle, New South Wales for Aden, Aden Colony. No further trace, presumed foundered with the loss of all hands.
Brookville	(United Kingdom of Great Britain and Ireland) Canada	The brig sprang a leak and sank at Biéville, Calvados, France. Only two of her six crew were aboard at the time. They were rescued.
Cornelia	Netherlands	The ship was wrecked at Arkhangelsk, Russia. Her crew were rescued. She was on a voyage from Arkhangelsk to Vlaardingen, South Holland.
Deux Frères	France	The ship was beached on the French coast. All on board were rescued. She was on a voyage from Saint-Malo, Ille-et-Vilaine to Granville, Manche.
Leader	United Kingdom	The schooner foundered in the English Channel off the coast of Seine-Inférieure, France with the loss of all five crew. She was on a voyage from Caen, Calvados to Ipswich, Suffolk.
Marie Josephine	France	The lugger was driven ashore and wrecked at Perros, Côtes-du-Nord. Her crew were rescued. She was on a voyage from Lannion, Côtes-du-Nord to Dartmouth, Devon, United Kingdom.
Mogadore Tetre	France	The ship was wrecked at Lingreville, Manche with the loss of four of her crew.
Nellie	United Kingdom	The steamship foundered in the Bay of Biscay 100 nautical miles (190 km) off Cape Finisterre, Spain. All on board were rescued by the schooner Sarah Anne (United Kingdom) and an Italian barque. Nelly was on a voyage from Cardiff, Glamorgan to Brindisi, Italy.
Spell	United Kingdom	The yacht was run into by the cutter Rosalie (United Kingdom) and sank off Cork. Her crew were rescued by Rosalie.
Workington	United Kingdom	The ship put in to Montevideo, Uruguay on fire. She was on a voyage from the Clyde to a port in California, United States. Attempts to extinguish the fire were unsuccessful and she was scuttled at Villa del Cerro on 5 September. She was sold, repaired and returned to service as the French ship Porte de Monte Video.

== 4 September ==
List of shipwrecks: 4 September 1874
Ship	State	Description
Carrie M.	United Kingdom	The brigantine sprang a leak and foundered in the English Channel 15 nautical miles (28 km) west of Beachy Head, Sussex. Her five crew survived. She was on a voyage from South Shields, County Durham to Cowes, Isle of Wight.
Humility	United Kingdom	The ship was abandoned in the North Sea off Great Yarmouth, Norfolk. Her crew were rescued. She was on a voyage from Rotterdam, South Holland, Netherlands to Sunderland, County Durham.

== 5 September ==
List of shipwrecks: 5 September 1874
Ship	State	Description
Ceres	Germany	The ship was driven ashore in Santa Anna Bay. Salvage efforts were abandoned on 15 September and she was condemned.
Easburg	(United Kingdom of Great Britain and Ireland) New South Wales	The steamship was driven ashore at Sydney. She was refloated.
William D. Steel	United Kingdom	The barque capsized in the River Tyne at South Shields, County Durham. All on board were rescued. She was subsequently righted.
Yorkshire	United Kingdom	The steamship arrived at Algiers, Algeria on fire and was scuttled. She was on a voyage from Malta to Algiers. She was severely damaged.

== 6 September ==
List of shipwrecks: 6 September 1874
Ship	State	Description
Oliver Cromwell	United Kingdom	The ship was destroyed by fire at sea. Her 21 crew took to the longboat. They landed in Table Bay on 9 September, having travelled 300 nautical miles (560 km). She was on a voyage from Newcastle upon Tyne, Northumberland to Aden.

== 7 September ==
List of shipwrecks: 7 September 1874
Ship	State	Description
Emma S.	Italy	The barque foundered in the Atlantic Ocean. Her crew were rescued.
Evening Star	United Kingdom	The ship struck the mole and sank at Arbroath, Forfarshire. She was on a voyage from Granton, Lothian to Arbroath. Also reported as occurring at Kronstadt, Russia and being on a voyage from Leith, Lothian to Kronstadt.
Hope	United Kingdom	The coble was driven ashore and severely damaged at Whitby, Yorkshire.
John Henry	United Kingdom	The brig was driven ashore and wrecked on the west coast of Jutland. She was on a voyage from Agrigento, Sicily, Italy to Kronstadt, Russia.
Phœnix	United Kingdom	The ship was driven ashore and wrecked at Wick, Caithness. Her crew were rescued.

== 8 September ==
List of shipwrecks: 8 September 1874
Ship	State	Description
Edith	United Kingdom	The schooner was abandoned in the North Sea. Her crew were rescued by the smack Goede Verwachting (Netherlands).
Pfeil	Germany	The steamship ran aground in the Elbe upstream of Cuxhaven.
Union	France	The barque was driven ashore in the Yangtze. She was on a voyage from Singapore, Straits Settlements to Shanghai, China. She was declared a total loss.

== 9 September ==
List of shipwrecks: 9 September 1874
Ship	State	Description
Alexandria	United Kingdom	The steamship collided with Tomas (United Kingdom) in the River Mersey and was beached at Tranmere, Cheshire. Her crew were rescued by tugs.
Balaguier	United Kingdom	The barque was abandoned in the Grand Banks of Newfoundland. Her thirteen crew were rescued by Ruby (United Kingdom).
Bliss	United Kingdom	The sloop was driven ashore and wrecked at Newhaven, Sussex. Her crew were rescued by the Coastguard using rocket apparatus. She was on a voyage from London to Southampton, Hampshire.
Coromandel	France	The ship ran aground at Bagdad, New York, United States and was wrecked.
Hestera Blanchard	United States	The barque was driven ashore on Terschelling, Friesland, Netherlands. She was on a voyage from Akyab, Burma to Bremen, Germany.
Jeune Alfred	France	The ship was wrecked at Abrevac'h, Finistère.
Linda Abbott	(United Kingdom of Great Britain and Ireland) Canada	The ship was driven ashore and damaged at Liverpool, Nova Scotia. She was on a voyage from Saint John, New Brunswick to Saint Thomas, Virgin Islands. She was refloated on 13 September and taken in to Liverpool.
Pocohontas	United Kingdom	The ship was destroyed by fire in the Pacific Ocean (20°04′S 83°14′W). Her crew were rescued by Danloe (United Kingdom). Pocohontas was on a voyage from South Shields, County Durham to Bombay, India.
118	Russia	The lighter collided with the steamship Cariet Axel (Sweden) and sank at Kronstadt.

== 10 September ==
List of shipwrecks: 10 September 1874
Ship	State	Description
Maria Magdalene	France	The barque was wrecked in the Componce River. She was on a voyage from Marseille, Bouches-du-Rhône to the Rio Nuñez.
Pickwick	United Kingdom	The schooner foundered in the Atlantic Ocean. Her seven crew were rescued by the barque Electra (United Kingdom). Pickwick was on a voyage from Richmond, Virginia, United States to Santos, Brazil.
Viscaya	Spain	The schooner departed from Hong Kong for Manila, Spanish East Indies. No further trace, presumed foundered with the loss of all hands.

== 11 September ==
List of shipwrecks: 11 September 1874
Ship	State	Description
Admiral	Russia	The schooner, on a voyage from Riga, Russian Empire to the River Tyne and on her maiden voyage, was driven ashore on the Navestone Rock, off North Sunderland, Northumberland, United Kingdom. Her crew abandoned her and were rescued by fishermen. Later Admiral floated off and was taken as a derelict to Amble
Albatross	United States	The schooner was wrecked on the coast of the Newfoundland Colony. There were at least two survivors.
Bertie	United Kingdom	The barque ran aground on a reef in the Gaspar Strait. She was on a voyage from Singapore, Straits Settlements to Liverpool, Lancashire. She was refloated and put back to Singapore for repairs.
Fraternité	France	The brig was discovered derelict in the North Sea by the smacks Antelope and Cambria (both United Kingdom). They took her in to Grimsby, Lincolnshire, United Kingdom on 14 September. Fraternité was on a voyage from Tvedestrand, Norway to Calais.
Hermann	Denmark	The barque was driven ashore in Algoa Bay. Her crew were rescued by the Algoa Bay Lifeboat.
Midlothian	United Kingdom	The ship was driven ashore at Clevedon, Somerset.
State of Georgia	United Kingdom	The steamship ran aground in the River Mersey. She was on a voyage from Liverpool, Lancashire to New York, United States. She was refloated on 14 September and resumed her voyage.
Tidjareti Bahire	Ottoman Empire	On a voyage from Constantinople to Varna, Ottoman Empire, the brig collided with the steamship Saintonge (France) and sank in the Black Sea; master and four crewmen lost.

== 12 September ==
List of shipwrecks: 12 September 1874
Ship	State	Description
Emir of Nupe	United Kingdom	The steamship ran aground at the mouth of the Nun River, Africa. Her crew were rescued. She was plundered by the local inhabitants and became a wreck. She was on her maiden voyage, from Glasgow, Renfrewshire to Africa.
India	Norway	The ship ran aground on the Goodwin Sands, Kent, United Kingdom. Her crew took to the boats; some of them were reported missing. India was later refloated and taken in to Gravesend, Kent.
Maria	Germany	The brigantine was driven ashore and wrecked at Castlerock, County Antrim, United Kingdom. Her crew were rescued. She was on a voyage from Arkhangelsk, Russia to Cork, United Kingdom.

== 13 September ==
List of shipwrecks: 13 September 1874
Ship	State	Description
Ariel	Norway	The barque ran aground at Narva, Russia and was severely damaged. Her crew were rescued. She was refloated in early October and placed under repair.
Marika	Sweden	The ship was driven ashore on Schiermonnikoog, Groningen, Netherlands. Her crew were rescued. She was on a voyage from Kalmar to London, United Kingdom.
Selica	Belgium	The steamship ran aground in the Dardanelles near "Nagara", Ottoman Empire. She was on a voyage from Reggio Calabria, Italy to Galaţi, Ottoman Empire.
Spitfire	United Kingdom	The ship departed from Gaboon for London. No further trace, presumed foundered with the loss of all fourteen crew.

== 14 September ==
List of shipwrecks: 14 September 1874
Ship	State	Description
Aurora	United Kingdom	The schooner ran aground off Hornbæk, Denmark and was wrecked. Her crew were rescued. She was on a voyage from Fraserburgh, Aberdeenshire to Danzig, Germany. She was refloated on 22 September and towed in to Helsingør, Denmark.
Carolina Maria	Norway	The ship was driven ashore at Narva, Russia. Her crew were rescued.
Countess of Dudley	United Kingdom	The ship was driven ashore on Anholt, Denmark. Her crew were rescued. She was refloated and towed in to Helsingør, Denmark in a leaky condition.
Ellen Marshall	United Kingdom	The ship was driven ashore at Östergarn, Sweden.
Favourite	(United Kingdom of Great Britain and Ireland) Jersey	The cutter struck a sunken rock and sank off Jersey.
Florence	Italy	The barque was wrecked on Ameland, Friesland, Netherlands with the loss of all but one of her crew. She was on a voyage from Akyab, Burma to Bremen, Germany.
Legulon Père	France	The barque was driven ashore at Falsterbo, Sweden. She was on a voyage from Riga, Russia to Dunkirk, Nord. She was refloated and taken in to Helsingør, Denmark.
Rebecca	United Kingdom	The ship ran aground on the Eider Grounds, in the North Sea off the mouth of the Eider. She was on a voyage from London to "Pahlhude". She was refloated and put in to Tønning, Germany in a leaky condition.
Skulda	(Russian Empire) Grand Duchy of Finland	The ship was driven ashore and wrecked at the mouth of the "Susjoki". Her crew were rescued. She was on a voyage from Grangemouth, Stirlingshire, United Kingdom to Oulu.
Thora	Norway	The ship was driven ashore at Narva. Her crew were rescued.

== 15 September ==
List of shipwrecks: 15 September 1874
Ship	State	Description
Collingwood	(United Kingdom of Great Britain and Ireland) New Zealand	The 15-ton ketch parted her cable outside Nelson Harbour, New Zealand, in a heavy swell, and stranded on a beach to the south of the harbour's mouth. All hands were saved.
D.R. Owen	United States	The schooner sank in a storm in the Chequamegon Bay area of Lake Superior east of Ashland, Wisconsin, near the mouth of the Bad River. Her crew survived.
Firenge	Italy	The barque was wrecked at Bornrif, Ameland, Friesland, Netherlands. She waws on a voyage from Akyab, Burma to Bremen, Germany.
Kedar	United Kingdom	The ship was abandoned in Chinese waters. Her crew were rescued by junks.
Thomas	United Kingdom	The schooner ran aground on the Shipwash Sand, in the North Sea off the coast of Suffolk. She was on a voyage from London to Sunderland, County Durham. She was refloated and assisted in to Harwich, Essex.
Venus	(United Kingdom of Great Britain and Ireland) Isle of Man	The smack was abandoned at Ramsey. Her four crew were rescued by the Ramsey Lifeboat Two Sisters ( Royal National Lifeboat Institution).
Virtue	United Kingdom	The ship foundered in the Bristol Channel off the coast of Somerset. Her crew were rescued. She was on a voyage from Gloucester, to Truro, Cornwall.

== 16 September ==
List of shipwrecks: 16 September 1874
Ship	State	Description
Dumbartonshire	United Kingdom	The barque caught fire at Buenos Aires, Argentina and was scuttled. She was on a voyage from Glasgow, Renfrewshire to Buenos Aires. She was refloated in early November.
Visayas	Spain	The steamship departed from Hong Kong for Manila, Spanish East Indies. Subsequently foundered off Luzon, Spanish East Indies.

== 17 September ==
List of shipwrecks: 17 September 1874
Ship	State	Description
Calcutta	United Kingdom	The full-rigged ship caught fire in the South Atlantic and was abandoned. Her crew took to three boats. Those in the jolly boat were rescued by the full-rigged ship Plantagenet (United Kingdom), those in the pinnace were rescued by the barque Lagos (Germany). Twelve crew in the longboat reached Saint Helena. Calcutta was on a voyage from South Shields, County Durham to Aden.
Nouvelle Albatross	France	The barque ran aground in the Componée River or the Mellacorée River. She was on a voyage from Marseille, Bouches-du-Rhône to the Rio Nuñez. She was consequently condemned.
Oribe	United Kingdom	The brig was driven ashore at East London, Cape Colony.

== 18 September ==
List of shipwrecks: 18 September 1874
Ship	State	Description
Adventurer	United Kingdom	The schooner was driven ashore and wrecked at Rattray Head, Aberdeenshire. Her crew were rescued by the Coastguard. She was on a voyage from Bangor, Caernarfonshire to Montrose, Forfarshire.
St. Joseph	France	The lugger was run down and sunk in the English Channel by the steamship Emanuel (Spain) with the loss of a crew member.
Vice-Admiral Chapond, or Vice-Admiral Chippard	France	The lugger collided with the steamship Charles Mitchell (United Kingdom) and sank in the English Channel 2 nautical miles (3.7 km) off Dungeness, Kent, United Kingdom with the loss of a crew member. Survivors were rescued by Charles Mitchell.

== 19 September ==
List of shipwrecks: 19 September 1874
Ship	State	Description
Dordogne	United Kingdom	The ship ran aground in the Vilaine. She was on a voyage from Redon, Ille-et-Vilaine to Cardiff, Glamorgan, United Kingdom. She was refloated and put back to Redon for repairs.
Erlen	Norway	The ship was wrecked at Fraserburgh, Aberdeenshire, United Kingdom. She was on a voyage from Fraserburgh to Stavanger.
Superbe	Sweden	The ship ran aground on the Øregrunds Grapen. She was on a voyage from Dundee, Forfarshire to Stockholm. She was refloated and taken in to Stockholm in a leaky condition.
Surprise	United Kingdom	The smack collided with the barque Ella Beatrice (United Kingdom) and sank in the North Sea 20 nautical miles (37 km) off Lowestoft, Suffolk. Her crew were rescued by Ella Beatrice.

== 20 September ==
List of shipwrecks: 20 September 1874
Ship	State	Description
Faithful	United Kingdom	The brigantine ran aground on the Nore. She was on a voyage from Llanelly, Glamorgan to London. She was refloated on 22 September and towed in to Gravesend, Kent in a leaky condition.
Laine	(Russian Empire) Grand Duchy of Finland	The ship put in to Palma de Mallorca on fire and was scuttled. She was on a voyage from Hull, Yorkshire, United Kingdom to Piraeus, Greece.

== 21 September ==
List of shipwrecks: 21 September 1874
Ship	State	Description
Asturiana	Spain	The barque was abandoned in the South China Sea. Her crew were rescued by the steamship Glengyle (United Kingdom). Asturiana was on a voyage from Hong Kong to Manila, Spanish East Indies.
Huddersfield	United Kingdom	The steamship was driven ashore at Hamburg. She was on a voyage from Hamburg to Grimsby, Lincolnshire.
John	United Kingdom	The coaster was driven ashore in Ballycotton Bay. Her crew were rescued.
Josephine	United Kingdom	The smack foundered off Padstow, Cornwall with the loss of all hands. She was on a voyage from Cardiff, Glamorgan to Newquay, Cornwall.
Maria	United Kingdom	The coaster was driven ashore in Ballycotton Bay. Her crew were rescued.
Marianne	France	The ship ran aground on the Goodwin Sands, Kent, United Kingdom. She was on a voyage from South Shields, County Durham, United Kingdom to Bordeaux, Gironde. She was refloated and taken in to Ramsgate, Kent.
10	Russia	The lighter collided with the steamship Tabor (United Kingdom) and sank at Kronstadt.

== 22 September ==
List of shipwrecks: 22 September 1874
Ship	State	Description
Admiral Fitzroy	United Kingdom	The barque caught fire off Cape Horn, Chile and was abandoned. Her thirteen crew reached the Falkland Islands in a boat. She was on a voyage from Swansea, Glamorgan to Valparaíso, Chile.
A. E. Vidal	Germany	1874 Hong Kong Typhoon: The barque was damaged in a typhoon at Hong Kong.
Aghios Nicholaos	Greece	The ship sprang a leak off Princess Island. She was taken in to Clarence Bay, Fernando Po, Spanish Guinea and was abandoned. She was on a voyage from Africa to Liverpool, Lancashire, United Kingdom.
Alaska	United States	Alaska 1874 Hong Kong typhoon: The paddle steamer was driven ashore in a typhoon at Aberdeen, Hong Kong, China.
Albay	Spain	Albay and Leonore 1874 Hong Kong Typhoon: The steamship sank in a typhoon at Hong Kong. She was on a voyage from Manila, Spanish East Indies to Hong Kong.
Aldebaran	Germany	1874 Hong Kong Typhoon: The brig sank in a typhoon at Hong Kong.
Amoy	United Kingdom	1874 Hong Kong Typhoon: The ship was reported missing after a typhoon at Hong Kong.
Amoy	United Kingdom	1874 Hong Kong Typhoon: The steamship ran aground in a typhoon at Hong Kong. She was refloated and placed under repair.
Ardent	United Kingdom	1874 Hong Kong Typhoon: The barque was damaged in a typhoon at Hong Kong. She was placed under repair.
Armand	United Kingdom	1874 Hong Kong Typhoon: The ship was damaged in a typhoon. She was on a voyage from Hong Kong to Niuzhuang, China. She put back to Hong Kong, where she arrived on 15 October.
Buda	Siam	1874 Hong Kong Typhoon: The ship was reported missing following a typhoon at Hong Kong.
Burra Noorloe	Siam	1874 Hong Kong Typhoon: The ship was reported missing after a typhoon at Hong Kong.
Carmelita and Ida	Germany	1874 Hong Kong Typhoon: The barque was damaged in a typhoon at Hong Kong.
Charlotte Andrew	United Kingdom	1874 Hong Kong Typhoon: The barque was damaged in a typhoon at Hong Kong.
Chevington	United Kingdom	The steamship collided with the steamship Edina (United Kingdom) and sank in the River Tyne. Chevington was on a voyage from Les Sables-d'Olonne, Vendée, France to the River Tyne.
Colina	United Kingdom	1874 Hong Kong Typhoon: The barque was damaged in a typhoon whilst on a voyage from Makassar, Netherlands East Indies to Macao, China. She put in to Manila in a leaky condition.
Comet	United States	1874 Hong Kong Typhoon: The full-rigged ship was driven ashore in a typhoon at Hong Kong. She was on a voyage from Hong Kong to Manila. Comet was refloated and put back to Hong Kong in a leaky condition. She was placed under repair.
Courier	United Kingdom	1874 Hong Kong Typhoon: The barque was reported missing following a typhoon at Hong Kong.
Courier	United Kingdom	1874 Hong Kong Typhoon: The brig was damaged in a typhoon at Hong Kong.
Dan	United Kingdom	1874 Hong Kong Typhoon: The ship was damaged in a typhoon whilst on a voyage from Hong Kong to Tianjin, China. She was towed back to Hong Kong in a leaky condition and was placed under repair.
Dannebrog	Denmark	The ship collided with Baltija Pidde (Russia) in the Baltic Sea and was abandoned. Dannebrog was on a voyage from Riga, Russia to a Danish port. She subsequently came ashore at Domesnes, Russia.
Duda	United Kingdom	1874 Hong Kong Typhoon: The ship was reported missing after a typhoon at Hong Kong.
Eaglet	United Kingdom	1874 Hong Kong Typhoon: The barque was damaged in a typhoon whilst on a voyage from Keelung to Tamsui, Taiwan. She put in to Amoy, China for repairs.
Ellesmere	United Kingdom	The schooner was driven ashore at Newcastle, County Down. She was on a voyage from Runcorn, Cheshire to Warrenpoint, County Antrim.
Everhard	Germany	1874 Hong Kong Typhoon: The barque was driven ashore in a typhoon at "Lantas". She was on a voyage from Hong Kong to New York, United States. She was a total loss.
Fei-lung	(Qing dynasty) Qing Navy	1874 Hong Kong Typhoon: The gunboat foundered off Cap Sing-Moon with the loss of all 43 crew.
Formosa	Spain	1874 Hong Kong Typhoon: The steamship was damaged in a typhoon. She was on a voyage from Hong Kong to Manila. She put back to Hong Kong in a leaky condition. She was subsequently placed under repair.
Georgina	United Kingdom	1874 Hong Kong Typhoon: The barque was damaged in a typhoon. She was on a voyage from Hong Kong to Fuzhou, China. She was towed in to Hong Kong.
Grace Darling	United States	The ship was driven ashore in Geographe Bay.
Gun	United Kingdom	1874 Hong Kong Typhoon: The barque was damaged in a typhoon at Hong Kong.
Ida	Germany	1874 Hong Kong Typhoon: The brig was damaged in a typhoon at Hong Kong.
Imogen	United Kingdom	1874 Hong Kong Typhoon: The brig sank in a typhoon at Hong Kong.
Lathley Rich	United States	1874 Hong Kong Typhoon: The full-rigged ship was damaged in a typhoon at Hong Kong.
Leonore	Spain	Albay and Leonore 1874 Hong Kong Typhoon: The steamship sank in a typhoon at Hong Kong with the loss of ten of the 46 people on board.
Lizzie and Rose	United Kingdom	1874 Hong Kong Typhoon: The barque was driven ashore in a typhoon at Hong Kong. She was declared a constructive total loss.
Lizzie H.	United Kingdom	1874 Hong Kong Typhoon: The brig was damaged in a typhoon at Hong Kong.
Llynllinfon	United Kingdom	The sloop was driven ashore at the Haulbowline Lighthouse, County Down. Both crew were rescued by a Coastguard boat.
Louisa	United Kingdom	1874 Hong Kong Typhoon: The ship was damaged in a typhoon. She was on a voyage from Hong Kong to Niuzhuang. She put back to Hong Kong.
Macao	Peru	1874 Hong Kong Typhoon: The full-rigged ship was wrecked in a typhoon at Hong Kong.
Maria y Vicenta	Spain	1874 Hong Kong Typhoon: The barque was severely damaged in a typhoon at Hong Kong. She was placed under repair.
Mary Jane	United Kingdom	The schooner was abandoned at Holyhead, Anglesey. Her crew were rescued by the Holyhead Lifeboat Princess of Wales ( Royal National Lifeboat Institution).
Matilda Atheling	United Kingdom	1874 Hong Kong Typhoon: The barque was damaged in a typhoon at Hong Kong.
Maury	Germany	1874 Hong Kong Typhoon: The barque sank in a typhoon at Hong Kong.
Medora	United Kingdom	1874 Hong Kong Typhoon: The ship was damaged in the Pacific Ocean in a typhoon. She was on a voyage from Fuzhou, China to Dunedin, New Zealand. She put in to Hong Kong and was placed under repair.
Mindanao	United Kingdom	1874 Hong Kong Typhoon: The brig sank in a typhoon at Hong Kong with the loss of a crew member.
Monktown	United Kingdom	The schooner was abandoned at Holyhead. Her crew were rescued by the Holyhead Lifeboat Princess of Wales ( Royal National Lifeboat Institution). Monktown was on a voyage from Liverpool to Wicklow.
Morning Light	United Kingdom	1874 Hong Kong Typhoon: The full-rigged ship was damaged in a typhoon at Hong Kong.
Muscat Merchant	Flag unknown	1874 Hong Kong Typhoon: The ship was abandoned in a typhoon. Her crew were rescued by Chinese junks. She was on a voyage from "Touron" to Hong Kong.
Nancy	United Kingdom	The brig foundered off the coast of County Waterford.
Onward	United Kingdom	1874 Hong Kong Typhoon: The ship was severely damaged in a typhoon. She was on a voyage from Hong Kong to Niuzhuang. She put back to Hong Kong.
Pawlaxet	United Kingdom	1874 Hong Kong Typhoon: The steamship was damaged in a typhoon at Hong Kong.
Peruvian	United Kingdom	1874 Hong Kong Typhoon: The brig was reported missing after a typhoon at Hong Kong.
Radama	United Kingdom	1874 Hong Kong Typhoon: The ship was damaged in a typhoon whilst on a voyage from Hong Kong to Niuzhuang, China. She put back to Hong Kong in a leaky condition and was placed under repair.
Sapphire	United Kingdom	The steamship was driven ashore and severely damaged at Leven, Fife. She was later refloated.
Sappho	United Kingdom	The yacht was driven ashore and wrecked at Waterford.
Scudres	France	The schooner ran aground in Mount's Bay and was wrecked.
Seabird	United States	1874 Hong Kong Typhoon: The schooner was driven ashore in a typhoon at Hong Kong.
Seaforth	Siam	1874 Hong Kong Typhoon: The ship was reported missing after a typhoon at Hong Kong.
Sopresa	Italy	The ship departed from Montevideo, Uruguay for Falmouth, Cornwall or Queenstown, County Cork, United Kingdom. No further trace, presumed foundered with the loss of all hands.
Tralee	Germany	1874 Hong Kong Typhoon: The barque was damaged in a typhoon at Hong Kong.
Therese	United States	1874 Hong Kong Typhoon: The ship was driven out to sea from Hong Kong in a typhoon.
White Cloud	United Kingdom	1874 Hong Kong Typhoon: The ship was wrecked in a typhoon at Macao.
Unnamed	United Kingdom	A schooner was abandoned at Holyhead. Her crew survived.
Unnamed	United Kingdom	A sloop was driven ashore and wrecked at Newcastle, County Down. Her three crew were rescued. She was on a voyage from Liverpool to Warrenpoint.
Unnamed	United Kingdom	A fishing smack foundered off the coast of County Waterford.
Two unnamed vessels	Flags unknown	1874 Hong Kong Typhoon: Two men-of-war were wrecked in a typhoon at Macao.
584 unnamed vessels	China	1874 Hong Kong Typhoon: Many junks sank or were driven ashore and wrecked in a typhoon at Macao.

== 23 September ==
List of shipwrecks: 23 September 1874
Ship	State	Description
Archibald	United Kingdom	The ship ran aground in the Crosby Channel. She was on a voyage from Fowey, Cornwall to Rangoon, Burma. She was refloated and taken in to Liverpool, Lancashire.
Isabella Kerr	United Kingdom	The full-rigged ship departed from Greenock, Renfrewshire for foundered Bombay, India. She subsequently foundered off the Isle of Skye, Outer Hebrides with the loss of all 31 crew, possibly on 21 October.
Liffey	United Kingdom	The steamship ran aground on rocks off Maldonado, Uruguay and was wrecked. All on board were rescued.
Malvern	United Kingdom	1874 Hong Kong Typhoon: The barque foundered in a typhoon off Singapore, straits Settlements with the loss of all hands.

== 24 September ==
List of shipwrecks: 24 September 1874
Ship	State	Description
Anna	Sweden	The barque was wrecked on St. Paul Island, Nova Scotia, Canada.
Gabrielle	United Kingdom	The barque foundered at sea. Her crew were rescued by the steamship Ambriz (United Kingdom). Gabrielle was on a voyage from Barrow-in-Furness, Lancashire to New York, United States.
Istapa	United Kingdom	The ship departed from Malabrigo, Peru for a British port. No further trace, presumed foundered with the loss of all hands.
Mentor	(United Kingdom of Great Britain and Ireland) Guernsey	The schooner ran aground at the mouth of the Benin River and was wrecked. She was consequently condemned.
Senator Iken	Germany	The full-rigged ship ran aground at Penarth, Glamorgan, United Kingdom.
Victory	United Kingdom	The schooner ran aground in the Dardanelles. She was on a voyage from Greenock, Renfrewshire to Galaţi, Ottoman Empire. She was refloated and taken in to Constantinople, Ottoman Empire.
Wave	United States	The ship was wrecked at Bragança, Brazil. She was on a voyage from New York to Pará, Brazil.

== 25 September ==
List of shipwrecks: 25 September 1874
Ship	State	Description
Camilla	United Kingdom	The steamship was wrecked on the Figueira Rock, off Lisbon, Portugal with the loss of a crew member. She was on a voyage from London to Porto, Portugal. The wreck was cleared by explosives on 5 October.
Canadian	United Kingdom	The brig was wrecked near Lemvig, Denmark. Her crew were rescued. She was on a voyage from Hamburg, Germany to a Finnish port.
Deux Amis	France	The ship sank at Port Napoléon, Mauritius.
Skiringsal, or Springaak	Norway	The barque was wrecked near Marstrand, Sweden with the loss of eight of her crew. She was on a voyage from London, United Kingdom to Sundsvall, Sweden.

== 26 September ==
List of shipwrecks: 26 September 1874
Ship	State	Description
Curieux	United Kingdom	The lugger was driven ashore at North Somercotes, Lincolnshire, United Kingdom.
Ettrick Dale	United Kingdom	The ship caught fire at South Shields, County Durham.
Friends	United Kingdom	The barque ran aground in the River Thames. She was on a voyage from Gothenburg, Sweden to London.
Irene	United Kingdom	The ship was driven ashore on the Swedish coast. She was on a voyage from Skellefteå, Sweden to London. She was refloated and taken in to Gothenburg.
John Saunderson	United Kingdom	The brigantine ran aground on the Milltown Bank, in the Belfast Lough. She was on a voyage from Troon, Ayrshire to Dublin. She was refloated.
Marietta W	Trieste	The ship was driven ashore on Barren Island, Maryland, United States. She was on a voyage from Philadelphia, Pennsylvania, United States to Bremen, Germany. She was refloated on 28 September and taken in to Annapolis, Maryland.
Pace	Italy	The barque was driven ashore near Stranraer, Wigtownshire, United Kingdom. Her crew survived. She was on a voyage from Troon to the Pacific Ocean. She was severely damaged in a gale on 8 October.
Red Sea	United Kingdom	The steamship was run into by the steamship Xenia (United Kingdom) and sank in the Irish Sea. Her 27 crew were rescued by Xenia. Red Sea was on a voyage from Constantinople, Ottoman Empire to Liverpool, Lancashire.
Swallow	United Kingdom	The Mersey Flat was struck by the propeller of the steamship Californian (United Kingdom) and sank at Liverpool.

== 28 September ==
List of shipwrecks: 28 September 1874
Ship	State	Description
Argonaut	United Kingdom	The ship was abandoned in the South China Sea in a typhoon. Her crew were rescued. She was on a voyage from Swansea, Glamorgan to Shanghai, China.
Granton	United Kingdom	The steamship ran aground at Kalmar, Sweden. She was refloated.
Pacific	United Kingdom	The brig ran aground 6 nautical miles (11 km) from the Bremerhaven Lighthouse, Germany and was wrecked. Her crew were rescued. She was on a voyage from Middlesbrough, Yorkshire to Brake, Germany.

== 29 September ==
List of shipwrecks: 29 September 1874
Ship	State	Description
Suffren	France	The barque was wrecked at Mossoló, Brazil. Her crew were rescued. She was on a voyage from Rio de Janeiro, Brazil to Liverpool, Lancashire, United Kingdom.

== 30 September ==
List of shipwrecks: 30 September 1874
Ship	State	Description
Ann	United Kingdom	The schooner departed from Sunderland, County Durham for Lossiemouth, Moray. No further trace, presumed foundered with the loss of all hands.
Julia	United Kingdom	The schooner collided with the steamship Dragoon (United Kingdom) and sank in the River Tyne. Her crew survived. Julia was on a voyage from Gravesend, Kent to the River Tyne.
Passover	United Kingdom	The ship ran aground at Cochin, India. she was refloated and found to be leaky. Subsequently repaired.
Warree	United Kingdom	The steamship was wrecked on the Sestros Rock, off Cape Palmas, Liberia. She was on a voyage from Liverpool, Lancashire to Lagos, Lagos Colony.
Zetland	United Kingdom	The barque was driven ashore and wrecked in the Bay de Loup. Her crew survived. She was on a voyage from the Clyde to Quebec City, Canada. She was consequently condemned.

== Unknown date ==
List of shipwrecks: Unknown date in September 1874
Ship	State	Description
Alexandre	United Kingdom	The ship put in to Montevideo, Uruguay on fire and was scuttled. She was on a voyage from Liverpool, Lancashire to Valparaíso, Chile.
Antonio Maria	Austria-Hungary	The ship was abandoned in the Atlantic Ocean before 6 September with some loss of life. She was on a voyage from Baltimore, Maryland to Queenstown, County Cork, United Kingdom. She was subsequently discovered by Ranger (United Kingdom), which put four of her crew on board. They took her in to Faial Island, Azores, where she arrived on 26 October.
Barsingerhorn	Netherlands	The barque ran aground off the coast of Sweden. She was on a voyage from Barsingerhorn, North Holland to Sundsvall, Sweden. She was refloated and put in to Fredrikshavn, Denmark in a leaky condition.
Batavia	Netherlands	The ship was wrecked in the Torres Strait. She was on a voyage from Australia to Java, Netherlands East Indies.
Bertolito Savona	Italy	The ship was wrecked near Brindisi. She was on a voyage from Sunderland, County Durham, United Kingdom to Savona.
Gl	Sweden	The ship ran aground near "Selegatal". She was on a voyage from Gävle to Hull, Yorkshire, United Kingdom. She was refloated on 30 September and resumed her voyage.
Civitta	Austria-Hungary	The brigantine sprang a leak and foundered. Her crew were rescued by an Italian vessel. She was on a voyage from New York, United States to Odesa, Russia.
Clwyd	United Kingdom	The yacht was wrecked at Prestatyn, Flintshire. Her crew were rescued.
Corinthian	United Kingdom	The steamship ran aground at "Malone". She was on a voyage from Glasgow, Renfrewshire to Quebec City, Canada. She was refloated.
Duke of Cornwall	United Kingdom	The ship foundered at sea.
Dunbrody	United Kingdom	The ship was driven ashore at Point Mille Vaches, Quebec, Canada. Her crew were rescued. She was on a voyage from Cardiff, Glamorgan to Quebec City. She was later refloated.
Eglantine	France	The ship ran aground at Tamatave, Mauritius. She was on a voyage from Madagascar to Mauritius. She was refloated and taken in to Mauritius for repairs.
Elina	Spain	The ship capsized in a gale at Wilmington, Delaware, United States. She was on a voyage from Havana to Wilmington.
Elizabeth	United Kingdom	The ship departed from Sundsvall for Sunderland in mid-October. No further trace, presumed foundered with the loss of all nine people on board.
Emilie	United Kingdom	The schooner ran aground at Macduff, Aberdeenshire. She was on a voyage from Wick, Caithness to Harburg, Germany.
Emily Waters	United Kingdom	The ship was driven ashore and wrecked in the St. Louis Pass. She was on a voyage from Liverpool to Galveston, Texas, United States. She was refloated in October and towed in to Galveston.
Emma	Netherlands	The steamship foundered. She was on a voyage from New York to Amsterdam, North Holland.
Enthusiast	United Kingdom	The barque was destroyed by fire at sea before 26 September. Her crew took to a boat; they were rescued three days later by Amelia (France). Enthusiast was on a voyage from London to Demerara, British Guiana.
Gaulois	France	The barque struck the Whale Rock, Mauritius and was wrecked before 28 September.
Guinevere	United Kingdom	The full-rigged ship was wrecked on the Pocklington Reef, off the coast of New Guinea before 23 September. She was on a voyage from London to Melbourne, Victoria.
Henry Flitner	United States	The ship was wrecked on Grand Turk, Turks Islands. She was on a voyage from New York to St. Jago de Cuba, Cuba.
Hios	Greece	The brig collided with the full-rigged ship Vincenzo Gianello (Italy) and sank in the Dardanelles.
Ida	United Kingdom	The barque was wrecked at Singapore, Straits Settlements. Her crew were rescued. She was on a voyage from Saigon, French Indo-China to "Tebay".
Irene	Germany	The ship was abandoned in the Atlantic Ocean. Her crew were rescued by Aldebaran (United Kingdom).
John Tennant	United Kingdom	The ship ran aground in the Hooghly River downstream of Calcutta, India.
Juno	Flag unknown	The ship was driven ashore in Table Bay. She was on a voyage from Boston to Table Bay.
Lady Agnes Duff	United Kingdom	The barque was driven ashore at the "Farg Lighthouse". She was on a voyage from Vyborg, Grand Duchy of Finland to London.
Lady Heathcote	United Kingdom	The ship was destroyed by fire at sea.
Lazareff	Russia	The steamship ran aground off "Bersene Point". She was on a voyage from Nicolaieff to the Nieuw Diep. She was refloated the next day and resumed her voyage.
Maria	United Kingdom	The ship ran aground on the Maplin Sand, in the North Sea off the coast of Essex. She was on a voyage from Algoa Bay to London. She was refloated with assistance.
Mariano I	United States	The brigantine was driven ashore at the mouth of the Rio Grande. She was on a voyage from Richmond, Virginia to the Rio Grande.
Marie Clemence	France	The ship ran aground on Saint Nicholas Rocks. She was on a voyage from a French port to Cardiff. She was refloated and beached at Paimbœuf, Loire-Inférieure.
Mary Ida	United Kingdom	The ship ran aground in the Dardanelles. She was on a voyage from Livorno, Italy to Berdianski, Russia. She was refloated.
Mesager de Saigon	France	The ship was wrecked on a reef off New Caledonia before 3 September. She was on a voyage from Bordeaux, Gironde to Noumea, New Caledonia.
Oestenbotten	Russian Empire	The steamship was destroyed by fire in the Gulf of Finland with the loss of sixteen lives. More than 80 survivors were rescued by a Norwegian vessel.
Palmyra	(United Kingdom of Great Britain and Ireland) Canada	The ship caught fire in the Indian Ocean. She was on a voyage from Liverpool to Madras, India.
Panaya Kimisi	Greece	The brig was driven ashore in the Dardanelles. She was refloated.
Palina	Italy	The ship collided with the steamship Meandre (France) and sank off Zea, Greece. Her crew were rescued.
Pilot	(United Kingdom of Great Britain and Ireland) New Zealand	The 167-ton cutter foundered off Ruapuke Island in southern New Zealand, while at anchor. The crew, who were on land at the time of the incident, all survived.
Prinds Carl	Denmark	The brig ran aground. She was on a voyage from Königsberg, Germany to Barrow-in-Furness, Lancashire. She was refloated and taken in to Helsingør in a leaky condition.
Prompt	Germany	The ship was wrecked at Santo Domingo Tonalá, Mexico.
Rosa Olivari	Flag unknown	The barque foundered in the Atlantic Ocean. At least six crew were rescued. She was on a voyage from New York to Cardiff.
Sangreal	United Kingdom	The ship was driven ashore and wrecked on East Falkland, Falkland Islands. Her crew were rescued.
Seudre	France	The ship was driven ashore at Looe, Cornwall, United Kingdom. She was refloated on 6 November and towed in to Penzance, Cornwall.
Söderhamn	Sweden	The barque ran aground at Höganäs. She was on a voyage from the Nieuwe Diep to Riga, Russia. She was refloated and towed in to Helsingør.
Spencer	United Kingdom	The ship was lost in the Grand Banks of Newfoundland. She was on a voyage from Quebec City to Portsmouth, Hampshire.
Star of Peace	United Kingdom	The ship was driven ashore at Hela, Germany. She was on a voyage from Danzig, Germany to Great Yarmouth, Norfolk. She was refloated and put back to Danzig in a leaky condition.
Tuapeka	(United Kingdom of Great Britain and Ireland) New Zealand	The 24-ton stern-wheeled paddle steamer struck rocks and sank in the lower reaches of the Molyneux River, New Zealand, close to Kaitangata, and sank. She had sunk on the river on a previous occasion (in June 1874) but this time she was unsalvageable.
Vacetta Maria	Flag unknown	The ship was wrecked in the Magdalen Islands, Nova Scotia, Canada. She was on a voyage from Quebec City to AmsterdamAmsterdam.
Venus	Norway	The barque was driven ashore at Cabo de Santa Maria, Portugal. Her crew were rescued.
Witness	United Kingdom	The ship ran aground at Lampsal Point, in the Dardanelles. She was on a voyage from Cardiff, Glamorgan to Constantinople, Ottoman Empire.She was refloated.
Workington	United Kingdom	The full-rigged ship caught fire in the South Atlantic, 200 nautical miles (370 km) east of Montevideo, Uruguay; after arrival there the fire could not be extinguished and was scuttled. She was on a voyage from Port Glasgow, Renfrewshire to San Francisco, California, United States with 1640 tons of coal. She was declared a total loss.
Yangtze	United Kingdom	The steamship was driven ashore at Hong Kong.
Unnamed	United States	A US Army Corps of Engineers sand dredge was driven two miles (3.2 km) inland, stripped and abandoned on the coast of Texas, possibly by Tropical Storm No. 4 in early September.
Unnamed	Ottoman Empire	A ship was run into and sunk by Amos (United Kingdom) in Ottoman waters.
