= Owen Springs =

Owen Springs may refer to:

- Owen Springs Power Station, a power station in Australia
- Owen Springs Reserve, a protected area in Australia
- Owen Springs Station, a former cattle station in Australia

== See also ==
- Owen (disambiguation)
