= Qikou, Liaoning =

Town of Dashiqiao City, Liaoning, China

Qikou 旗口镇
- Town
- Location in Liaoning
- Coordinates: 40°51′34″N 122°25′37″E
- Country: People's Republic of China
- Province: Liaoning
- Prefecture-level city: Yingkou
- County-level city: Dashiqiao
- Time zone: UTC+8 (China Standard)

Qikou (Chinese: 旗口; pinyin: Qíkǒu) is a town in Dashiqiao, central Liaoning Province in Northeast China. It is located 25 kilometres (16 mi) north-northwest of Dashiqiao and 27 kilometres (17 mi) northeast of the port city of Yingkou.
