= Xinjian Subdistrict, Yingkou =

Xinjian Subdistrict 新建街道
- Subdistrict
- Location in Liaoning
- Coordinates: 40°51′1″N 122°21′33″E
- Country: People's Republic of China
- Province: Liaoning
- Prefecture-level city: Yingkou
- District: Zhanqian District
- Time zone: UTC+8 (China Standard)

Xinjian Subdistrict (Chinese: 新建街道; pinyin: Xīnjiàn Jiēdào) is a subdistrict in Zhanqian District, Yingkou, Liaoning province, China. As of 2018, it has six residential communities under its administration.

== See also ==
- List of township-level divisions of Liaoning
