= Zhanqian District =

Zhanqian 站前区
- District
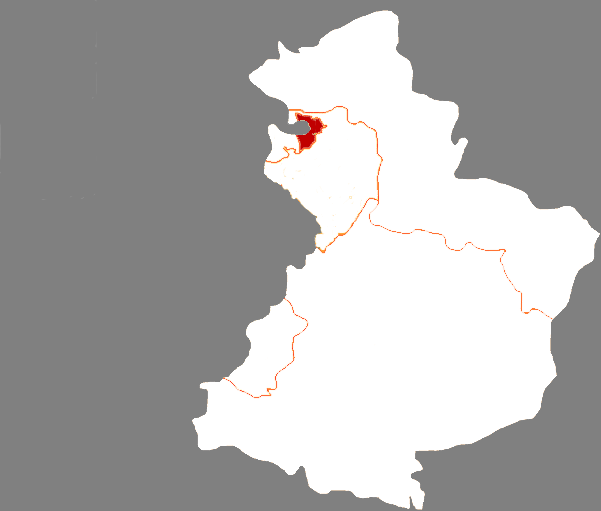
- Location in Yingkou
- Coordinates: 40°40′22″N 122°15′32″E
- Country: China
- Province: Liaoning
- Prefecture-level city: Yingkou
- District seat: Xinjian Subdistrict

Area
  - Total: 70.4 km^{2} (27.2 sq mi)

Population (2020 census)
  - Total: 261,439
  - Density: 3,710/km^{2} (9,620/sq mi)
- Time zone: UTC+8 (China Standard)
- Website: www.ykzq.gov.cn

Zhanqian District (simplified Chinese: 站前区; traditional Chinese: 站前區; pinyin: Zhànqián Qū) is a district of the city of Yingkou, Liaoning, China.

== Administrative divisions ==
There are 6 subdistricts within the district.

Yuejin Subdistrict (跃进街道), Jianshe Subdistrict (建设街道), Batiandi Subdistrict (八田地街道), Dongfeng Subdistrict (东风街道), Jianfeng Subdistrict (建丰街道), Xinjian Subdistrict (新建街道)
