= Fuxing Barn =

Former barn in Fuxing, Changhua County, Taiwan

- 福興穀倉
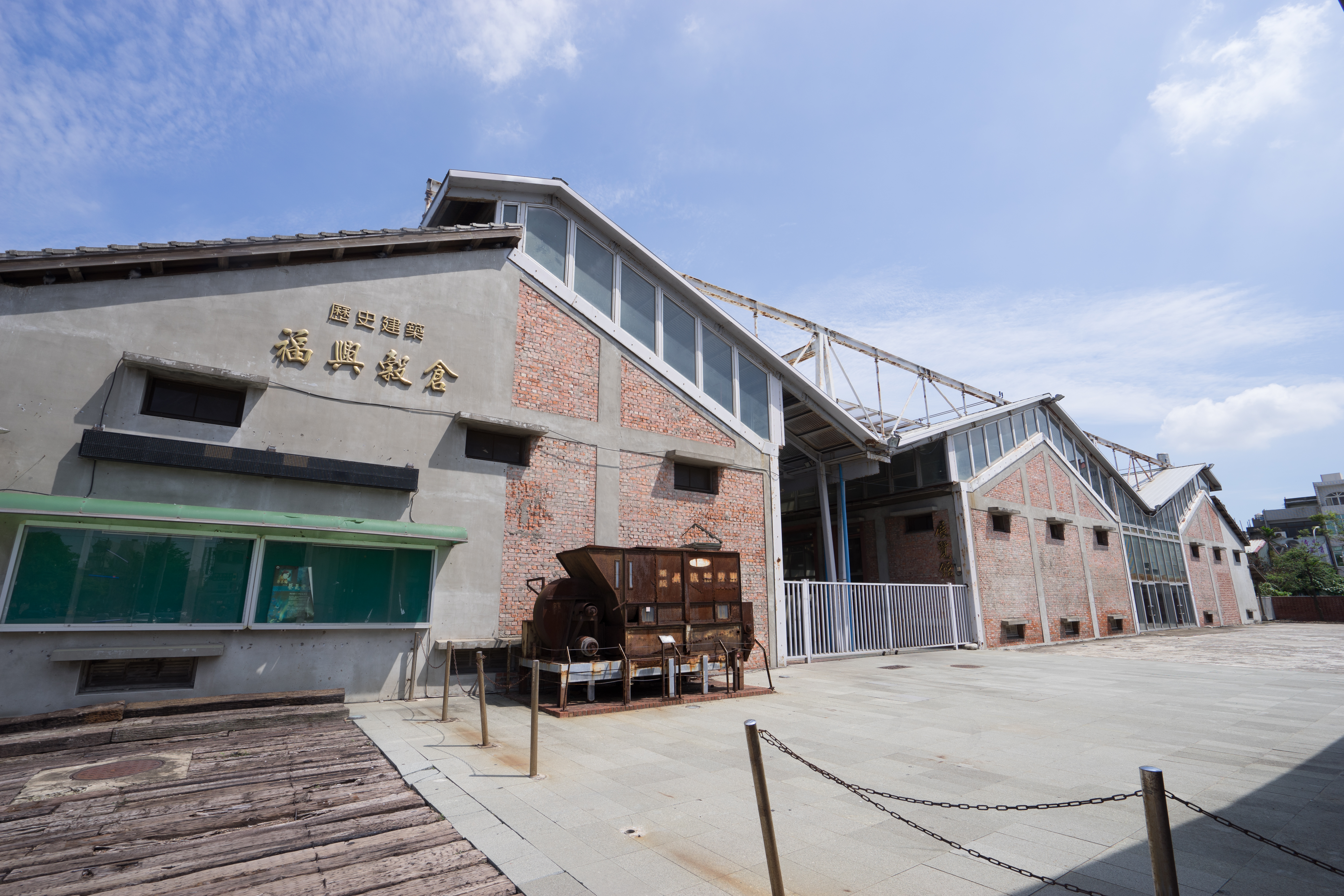
- Interactive map of the Fuxing Barn area

General information
- Type: former barn
- Location: Fuxing, Changhua County, Taiwan
- Coordinates: 24°02′58.7″N 120°26′23.8″E
- Completed: 1928
- Renovated: 2020–2021

Technical details
- Floor area: 3,305 m^{2} (35,570 sq ft)

The Fushing Barn (traditional Chinese: 福興穀倉; simplified Chinese: 福兴谷仓; pinyin: Fúxìng Gǔcāng) is a former barn in Fuxing Township, Changhua County, Taiwan.

== History ==
The barn was built in 1928, during Japanese rule in the 17th year of Mingkuo, by Fuxing Farmers' Association and was originally designed to store rice from different regions in Fuxing Township. The barn was the largest Japanese-style barn in central Taiwan. It was designated as a historic site in 2003. In 2020, the barn underwent overhaul renovation with a budget of NT$45 million from Changhua County Government and the Ministry of Culture. The work was completed in May 2021.

== Architecture ==
The barn was built by old-fashioned techniques that use rough shell rice, rice straw and clay for its walls. It is equipped with a rice mill room for the production facilities. It consists of 16 barns and three main buildings: a grain store, a mill and a rice store. The roof windows were intended to dissipate heat and are referred to as "tiger window". The ventilation systems in the windows and walls prevent moisture from causing the rice to swell, ferment or germinate.

== See also ==
- List of tourist attractions in Taiwan
