= Fuxing, Changhua =

Fuxing Township 福興鄉 Fusing
- Rural township
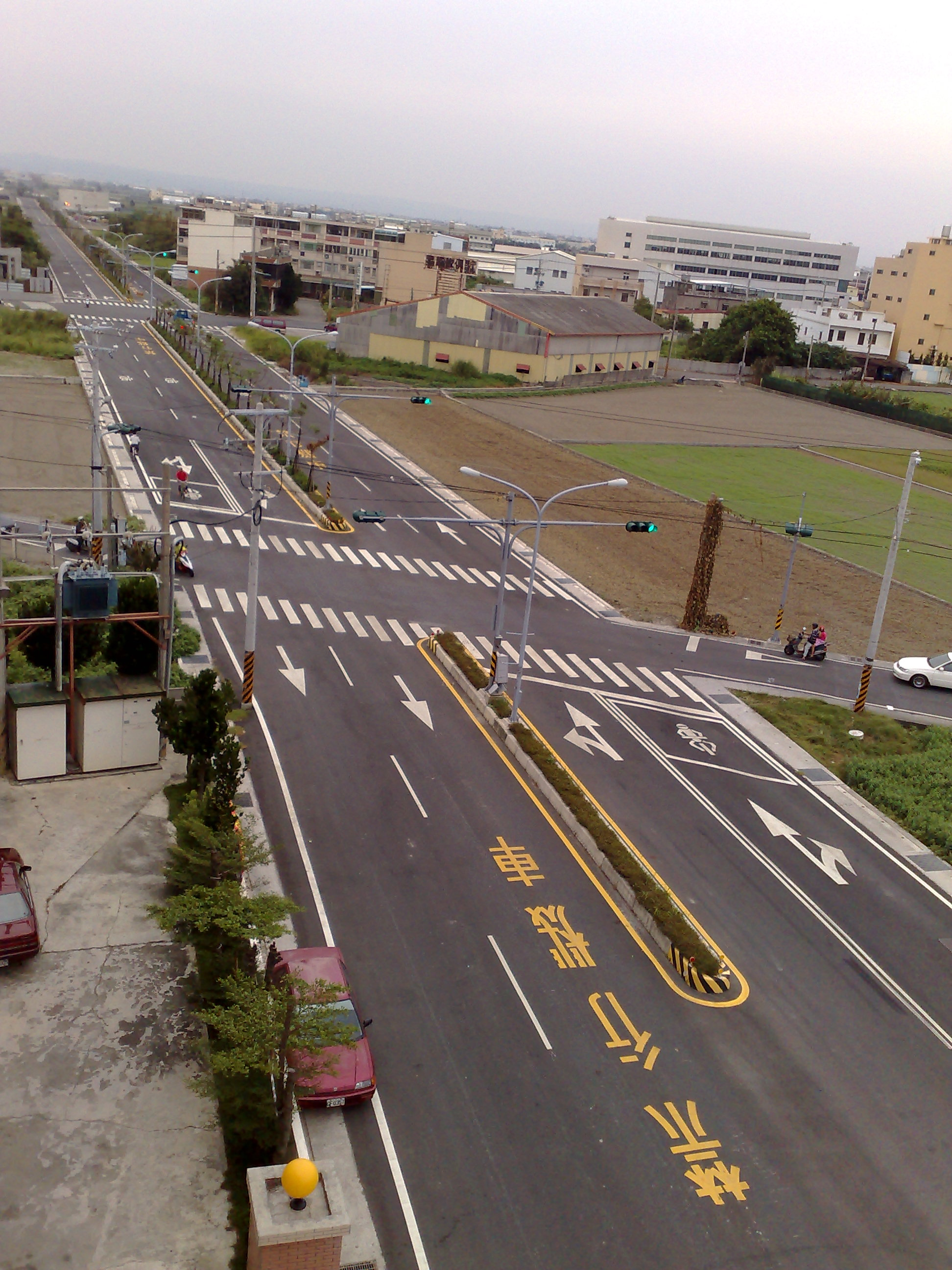

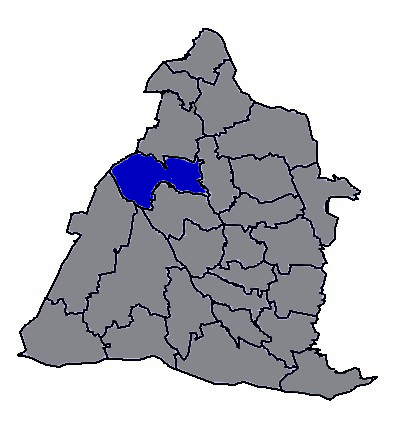
- Fuxing Township in Changhua County

- Location within Taiwan
- Coordinates: 24.034079°N 120.423519°E
- Country: Taiwan
- County: Changhua County

Area
  - Total: 50 km^{2} (19 sq mi)

Population (March 2023)
  - Total: 45,388
  - Density: 910/km^{2} (2,400/sq mi)

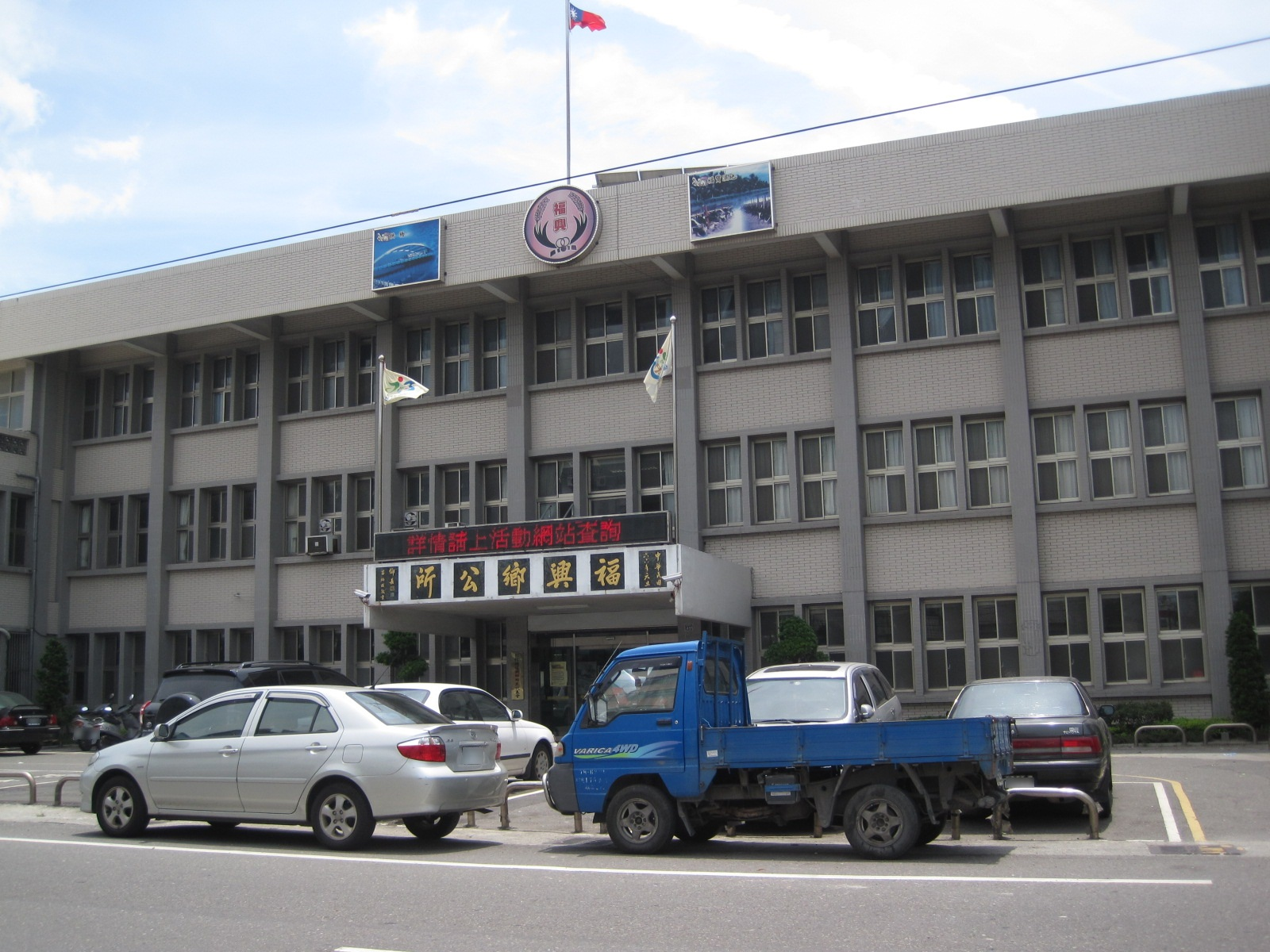
Fuxing Township Office

Fuxing Township (Chinese: 福興鄉; pinyin: Fúxīng Xiāng) is a rural township bordering Lukang in northwestern Changhua County, Taiwan.

== Geography ==
Fuxing encompasses 49.89 km^{2} (19.26 sq mi) and a population of 45,388, including 23,697 males and 21,691 females as of March 2023.

== Administrative divisions ==
The township comprises 22 villages: Dalun, Dingnian, Ergang, Fubao, Funan, Fuxing, Maicuo, Panpo, Panshe, Qiaotou, Sanbian, Sanhe, Shewei, Tongan, Waipu, Waizhong, Wanfeng, Xianian, Xishi, Xiucuo, Yuanzhong and Zengping.

== Tourist attractions ==
- Fuxing Arch Bridge
- Cheese Agriculture Area
- Fubao Wetland
- Fuxing Barn
- Old Canon Flat
- Fuxing seashell temple

== Notable natives ==
- Chen Chin-ting, member of Legislative Yuan (1999–2008)
- Huang Chao-shun, member of Legislative Yuan (1993–2020)
