= Owens =

Owens may refer to:

== Places in the United States ==
- Owens Station, Delaware
- Owens Township, St. Louis County, Minnesota
- Owens, Missouri
- Owens, Ohio
- Owens, Texas
- Owens, Virginia

== People ==
- Owens (surname), including a list of people with the name
- Owens Brown, American politician and activist in West Virginia
- Owens Wiwa, Nigerian doctor and human rights activist

== Other uses ==
- Owens v Owens, 2018 divorce case in the Supreme Court of the United Kingdom
- Victoria University of Manchester, once known as Owens College (an unofficial name sometimes used by staff and students at UMIST)
- Owens Corning, an American glass company

== See also ==
- Owen's (disambiguation)
- Owen (disambiguation)
- Owain (disambiguation)
