= Dashiqiao =

City in Liaoning, China

Dashiqiao 大石桥市 Tashihkiao
- County-level city
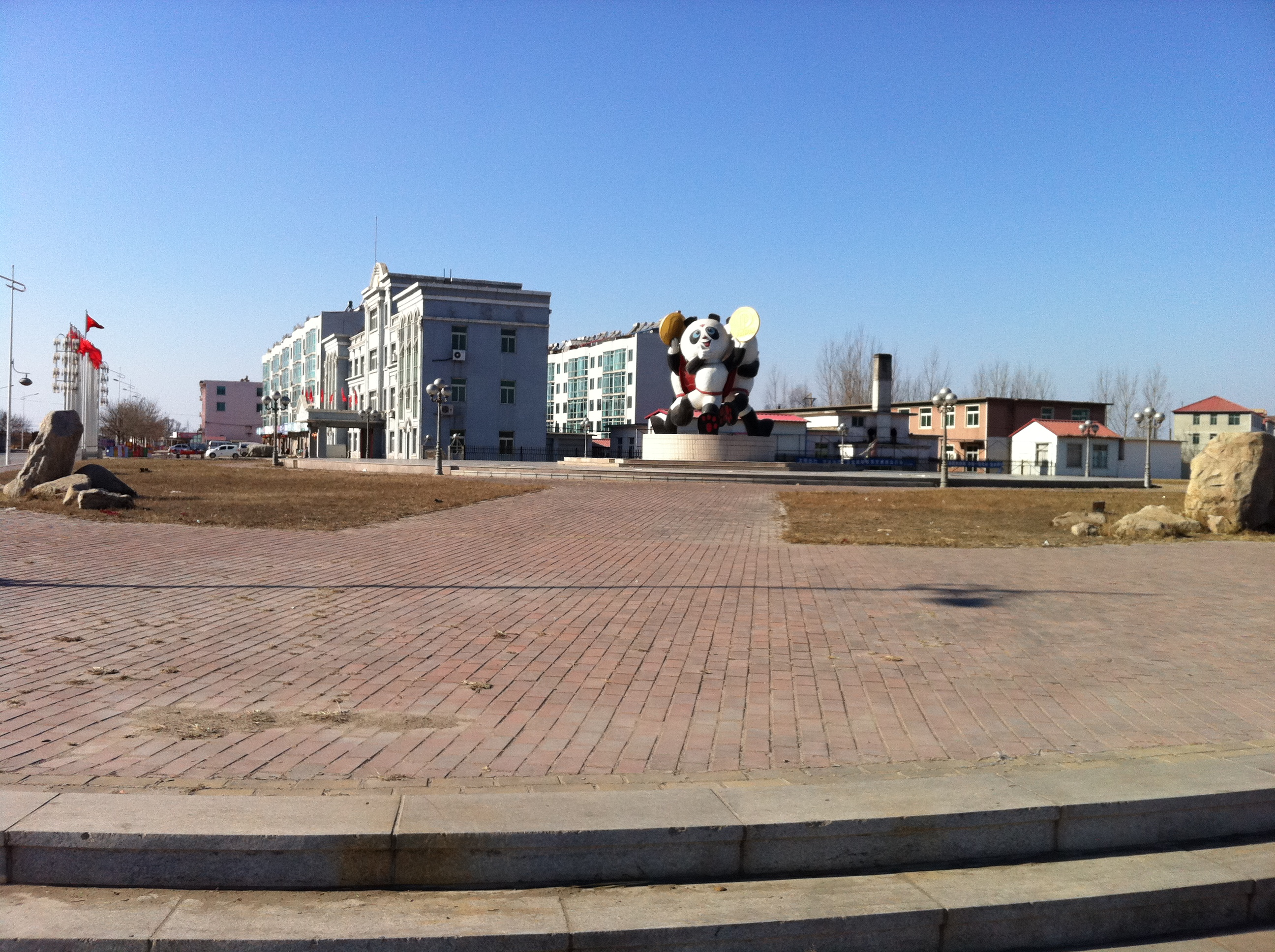

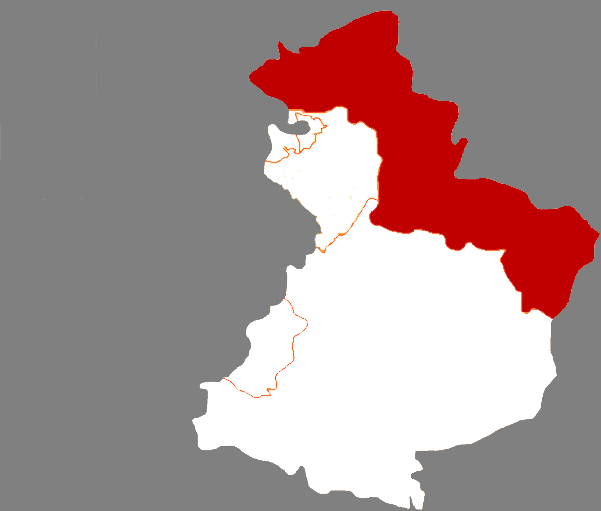
- Location of the county within Yingkou

- Location in Liaoning
- Coordinates: 40°37′N 122°31′E
- Country: People's Republic of China
- Province: Liaoning
- Prefecture-level city: Yingkou

Area
  - County-level city: 1,610.0 km^{2} (621.6 sq mi)
  - Urban: 150.00 km^{2} (57.92 sq mi)
- Elevation: 45 m (148 ft)

Population (2020 census)
  - County-level city: 607,098
  - Density: 377.08/km^{2} (976.63/sq mi)
  - Urban: 309,066
- Time zone: UTC+8 (China Standard)

Dashiqiao
- Simplified Chinese: 大石桥
- Traditional Chinese: 大石橋
- Postal: Tashihkiao
Transcriptions
Standard Mandarin
- Hanyu Pinyin: Dàshíqiáo
- Wade–Giles: Ta^{4}-shih^{2}-ch'iao^{2}

Dashiqiao (simplified Chinese: 大石桥; traditional Chinese: 大石橋; pinyin: Dàshíqiáo; lit. 'Great Stone Bridge') is a county-level city in south-central Liaoning province, Northeast China. It is under the administration of the prefectural city of Yingkou, the downtown of which is 23 kilometres (14 mi) to the west.

== Administrative Divisions ==
There are five subdistricts and 11 towns under the city's administration.

Subdistricts:

- Shiqiao Subdistrict (石桥街道), Qinghua Subdistrict (青花街道), Jinqiao Subdistrict (金桥街道), Gangdu Subdistrict (钢都街道), Nanlou Subdistrict (南楼街道)

Towns:

- Shuiyuan (水源镇), Gouyan (沟沿镇), Shifo (石佛镇), Gaokan (高坎镇), Qikou, Huzhuang (虎庄镇), Guantun (官屯镇), Boluopu (博洛铺镇), Yong'an (永安镇), Tangchi (汤池镇), Huangtuling (黄土岭镇), Zhoujia (周家镇)

== Climate ==
Climate data for Dashiqiao, elevation 12 m (39 ft), (1991–2020 normals, extremes 1981–2025)
Month	Jan	Feb	Mar	Apr	May	Jun	Jul	Aug	Sep	Oct	Nov	Dec	Year
Record high °C (°F)	9.1 (48.4)	19.1 (66.4)	23.6 (74.5)	29.9 (85.8)	34.1 (93.4)	34.5 (94.1)	35.0 (95.0)	35.3 (95.5)	33.1 (91.6)	28.1 (82.6)	21.0 (69.8)	14.6 (58.3)	35.3 (95.5)
Mean daily maximum °C (°F)	−2.8 (27.0)	1.7 (35.1)	8.1 (46.6)	17.1 (62.8)	23.8 (74.8)	27.5 (81.5)	29.6 (85.3)	29.2 (84.6)	25.2 (77.4)	17.5 (63.5)	7.7 (45.9)	−0.3 (31.5)	15.4 (59.7)
Daily mean °C (°F)	−8.2 (17.2)	−3.8 (25.2)	2.8 (37.0)	11.5 (52.7)	18.4 (65.1)	22.8 (73.0)	25.5 (77.9)	24.7 (76.5)	19.5 (67.1)	11.9 (53.4)	2.6 (36.7)	−5.3 (22.5)	10.2 (50.4)
Mean daily minimum °C (°F)	−12.9 (8.8)	−8.6 (16.5)	−1.9 (28.6)	6.1 (43.0)	13.2 (55.8)	18.4 (65.1)	22.0 (71.6)	20.9 (69.6)	14.5 (58.1)	6.9 (44.4)	−1.8 (28.8)	−9.6 (14.7)	5.6 (42.1)
Record low °C (°F)	−30.8 (−23.4)	−27.2 (−17.0)	−18.1 (−0.6)	−6.9 (19.6)	0.3 (32.5)	7.2 (45.0)	13.8 (56.8)	11.8 (53.2)	0.3 (32.5)	−7.2 (19.0)	−17.8 (0.0)	−23.2 (−9.8)	−30.8 (−23.4)
Average precipitation mm (inches)	3.7 (0.15)	7.0 (0.28)	11.7 (0.46)	32.7 (1.29)	53.5 (2.11)	77.3 (3.04)	141.9 (5.59)	165.2 (6.50)	53.6 (2.11)	36.5 (1.44)	20.8 (0.82)	8.7 (0.34)	612.6 (24.13)
Average precipitation days (≥ 0.1 mm)	2.6	2.7	3.9	6.1	7.8	9.6	10.6	10.1	6.8	6.2	5.1	3.3	74.8
Average snowy days	4.0	3.4	2.8	0.7	0	0	0	0	0	0.3	3.2	4.0	18.4
Average relative humidity (%)	58	53	52	51	55	67	77	78	70	63	61	60	62
Mean monthly sunshine hours	186.8	192.6	232.8	240.3	264.9	228.4	199.1	206.5	227.5	212.5	168.8	167.0	2,527.2
Percentage possible sunshine	63	64	63	60	59	51	44	49	62	62	57	58	58
Source: China Meteorological Administration
