= Mount Owen =

Mount Owen can refer to:

- Mount Owen (New Zealand)
- Mount Owen (British Columbia) in the Canadian Rockies
- Mount Owen (Antarctica)
- Mount Owen (Colorado) in the Ruby Range of Colorado, USA
- Mount Owen (Tasmania) in the West Coast Range of Tasmania, Australia
- Mount Owen (Wyoming) in the Teton Range of Wyoming, USA
