= Owen (automobile) =

Defunct American motor vehicle manufacturer

Owen Motor Car Company
- Company type: Automobile manufacturer
- Industry: Automotive
- Founded: 1910; 116 years ago
- Defunct: 1912; 114 years ago
- Fate: Sold
- Successor: REO Motor Car Company
- Headquarters: Detroit, Michigan, United States
- Key people: Ralph R. Owen, Angus Smith, Frank E. Dodson
- Products: Automobiles

The Owen was a brass era luxury automobile built in Detroit, Michigan by the Owen Motor Car Company from 1910 to 1912.

== History ==
The Owen, designed by Ralph Owen, was a luxury automobile with a 50-hp, 425 cubic inches (6.96 L) four-cylinder engine. It had progressive features such as left-hand steering, a central gear change, and was placed on a lowered chassis with 42-inch tires, which gave it a similar appearance to the Oldsmobile Limited. The touring car style sold for $3,200 (equivalent to $110,571 in 2025) while the limousine cost $4,800 (equivalent to $165,857 in 2025).

Ralph Owen contracted with his brother Raymond M. Owen to market the car through the R. M. Owen & Company. The company was a dealer for the Reo Motor Car. Reo later decided to purchase the Owen Motor Car Company, finished constructing 35 Owen automobiles and then closed the company. The Owen factory was sold to the Krit Motor Car Company.

In 1912, Ralph Owen began work on a new car that would become the Owen Magnetic.

== Advertisements ==
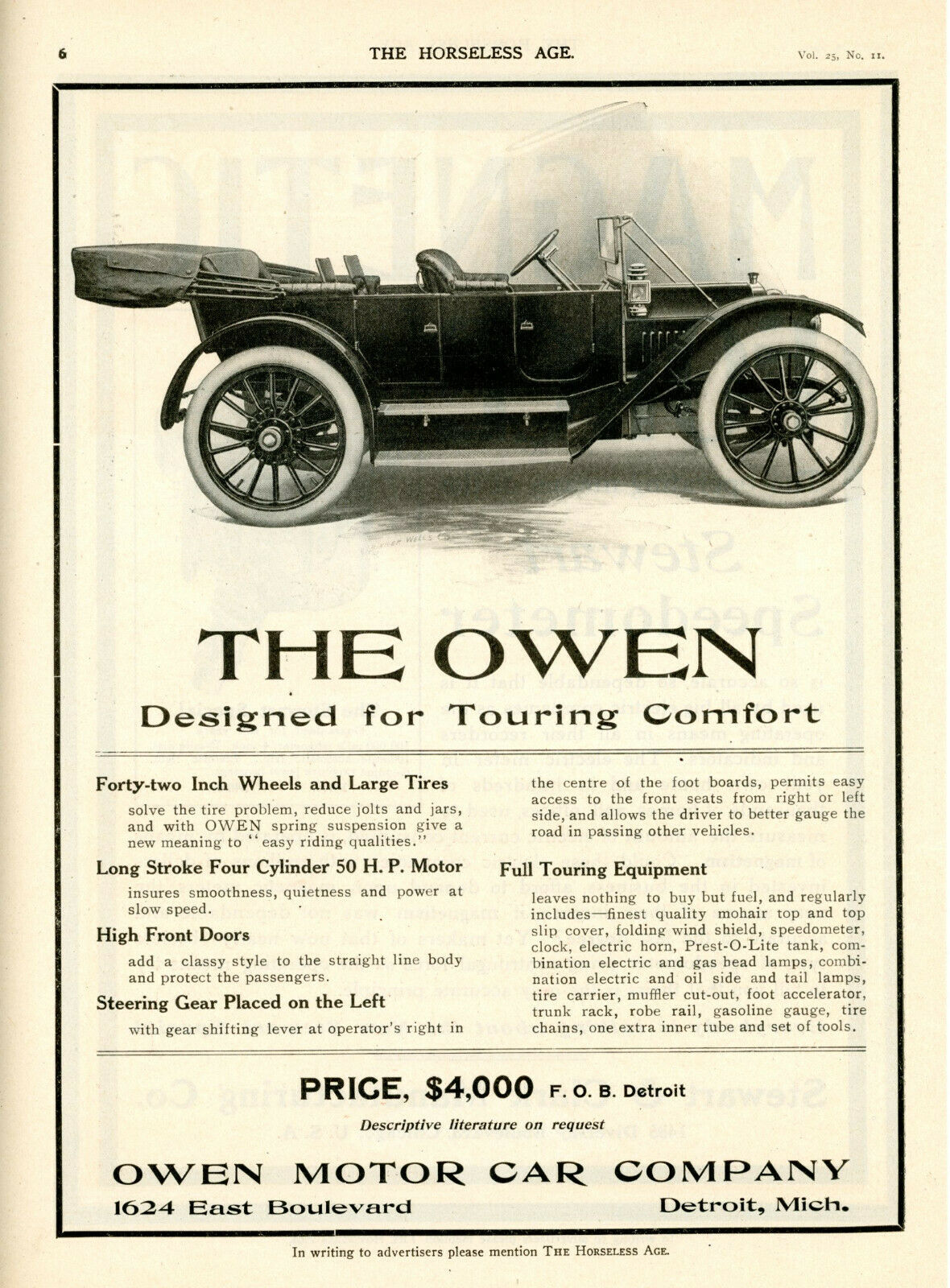
1910 Owen Motor Car Advertisement in the Horseless Age Magazine

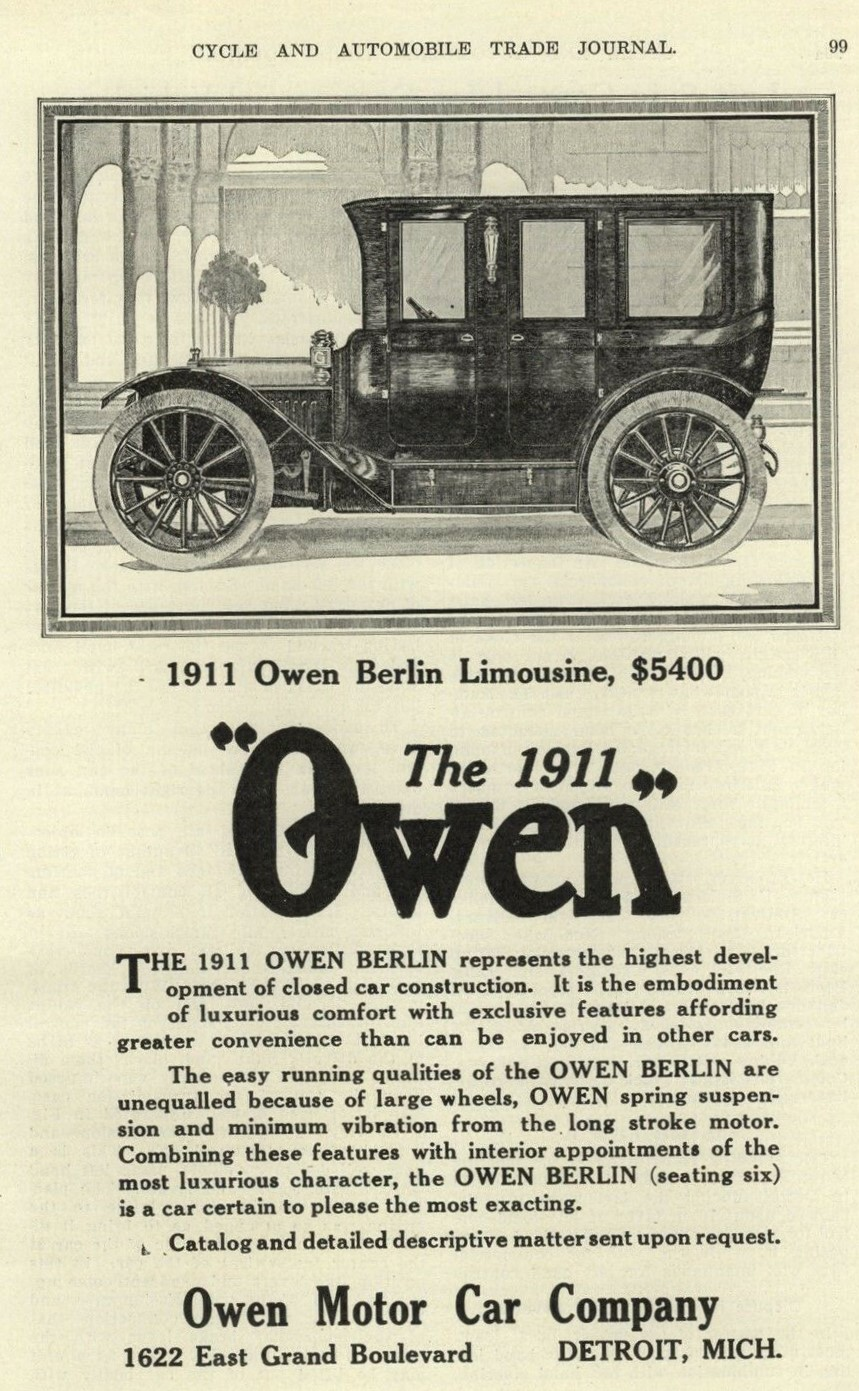
1910 Owen Motor Car advertisement in the Cycle and Automobile Trade Journal

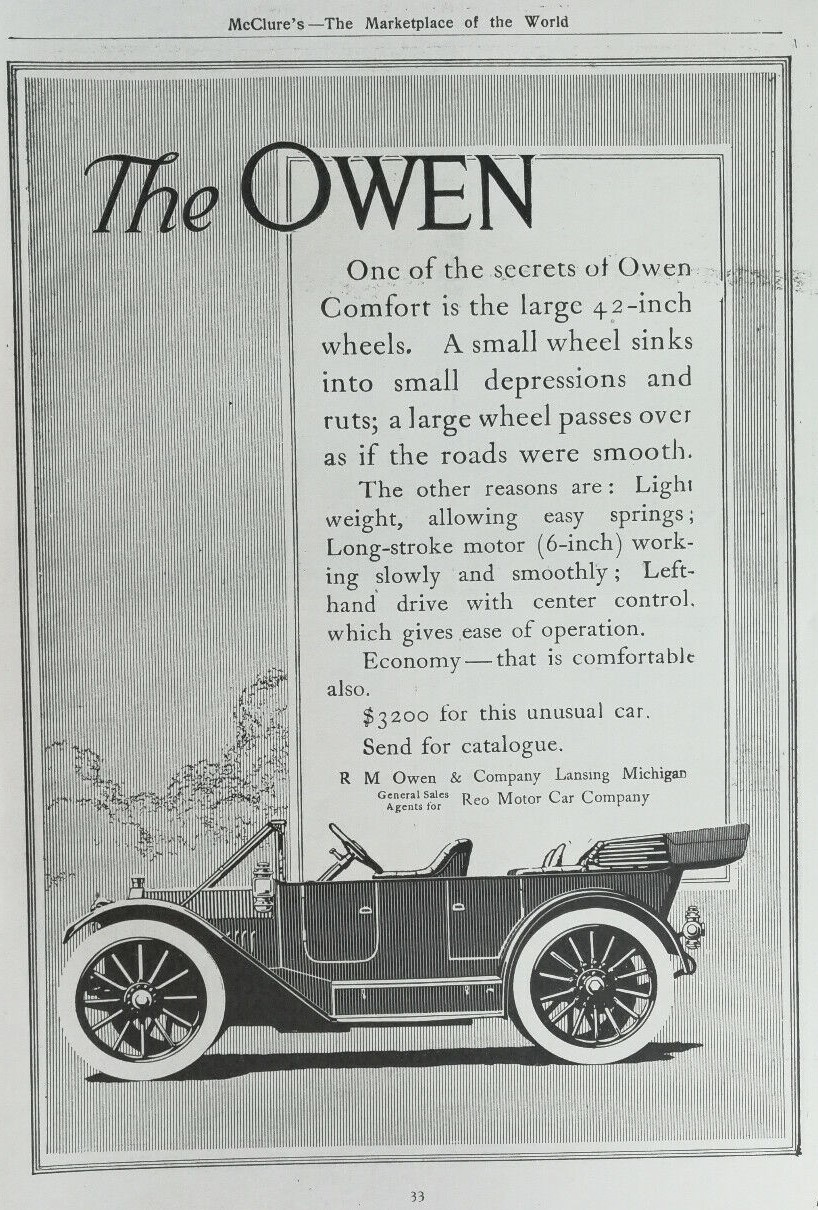
1911 Owen Motor Car advertisement in McClure's Magazine
