= Owen, Missouri =

Extinct Town

Coordinates: 38°55′08″N 90°51′54″W

Owen is an extinct town in Lincoln County, in the U.S. state of Missouri.

Owen was platted in 1884, and named after James W. Owen, a local merchant. A post office called Owen was established in 1883, and remained in operation until 1915.
