= Owen's =

Owen's may refer to:

- Owen's Defence, a chess opening
- Owen's Market, an Indiana grocery store chain owned by Kroger

== See also ==
- Owens (disambiguation)
