= Owen Township =

Owen Township may refer to the following townships in the United States:

== Arkansas ==
- Owen Township, Dallas County, Arkansas
- Owen Township, Lincoln County, Arkansas
- Owen Township, Poinsett County, Arkansas
- Owen Township, Saline County, Arkansas

== Illinois ==
- Owen Township, Winnebago County, Illinois

== Indiana ==
- Owen Township, Clark County, Indiana
- Owen Township, Clinton County, Indiana
- Owen Township, Jackson County, Indiana
- Owen Township, Warrick County, Indiana

== Iowa ==
- Owen Township, Cerro Gordo County, Iowa
