= Xishi, Fuxing =

Coordinates: 24.041095°N 120.437358°E

Xishi Village 西勢村
- Rural village
- Interactive map of Xishi Village 西勢村
- Location: Fuxing Township, Changhua County, Taiwan

Area
  - Total: 0.8746 km^{2} (0.3377 sq mi)

Population
  - Total: 2,394

Xishi Village (Chinese: 西勢村; pinyin: Xīshì Cūn) is a rural village in Fuxing Township, Changhua County, Taiwan with a population of 2342, and an area of 0.9746 km^{2}.

Xishi Village is bordered on the North by Lugang Township, on the South by Tongan township. Most people in the area emigrated from the neighbouring town of Lugang.

== Sights ==
HuangShen Gong (Holy Emperor Temple) Built in 1982 and serves as the village religious centre.

== Produce ==
Specialties of the area include Dried Carrot strips. The production of this specialty used to be the sole means of income for many villagers in the past. There remain very few family producers still in operation.

Brooms used to be made here, but production has stopped due to factory methods being primary means of production today.
