= Laobian District =

Coordinates: 40°41′00″N 122°19′29″E

Laobian 老边区
- District
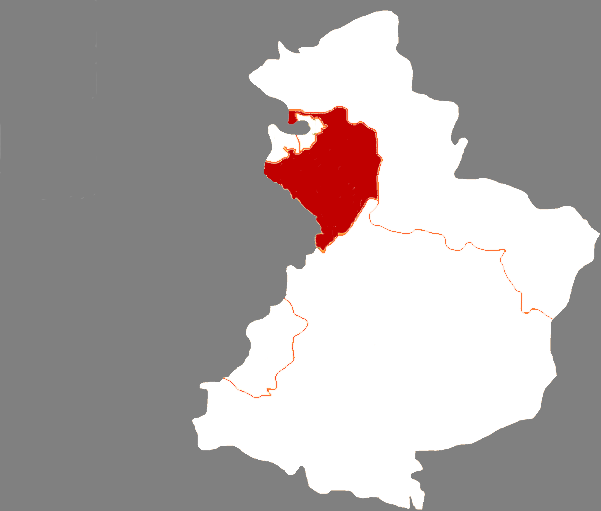
- Location in Yingkou

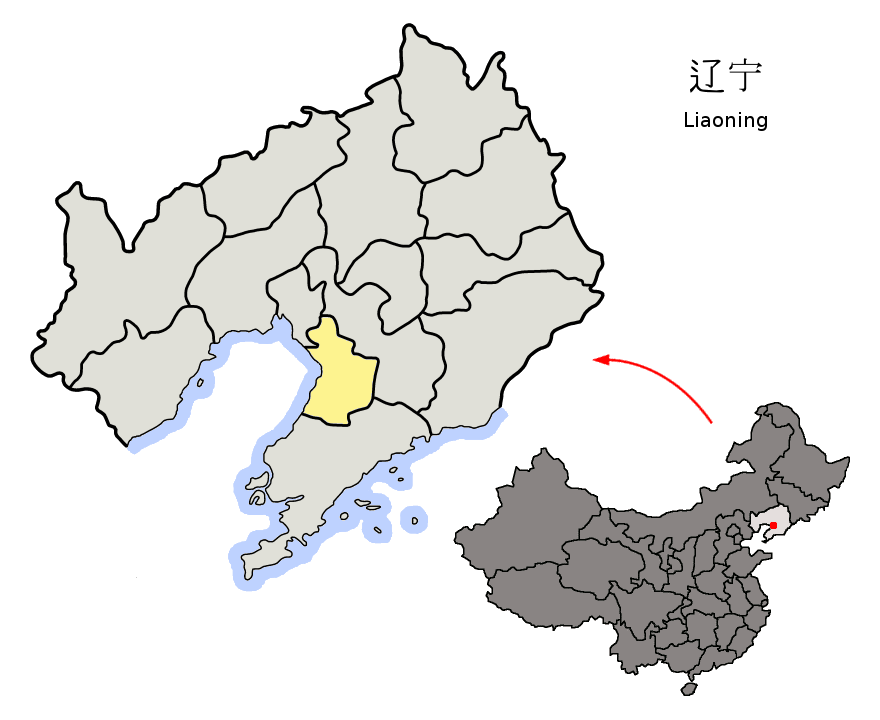
- Yingkou in Liaoning
- Country: People's Republic of China
- Province: Liaoning
- Prefecture-level city: Yingkou

Area
  - Total: 249.4 km^{2} (96.3 sq mi)

Population (2020 census)
  - Total: 146,748
  - Density: 588.4/km^{2} (1,524/sq mi)
- Time zone: UTC+8 (China Standard)

Laobian District (simplified Chinese: 老边区; traditional Chinese: 老邊區; pinyin: Lǎobiān Qū) is a district of the city of Yingkou, Liaoning province, People's Republic of China.

== Administrative divisions ==
There are two subdistricts and four towns within the district.

Subdistricts:

- Laobian Subdistrict (老边街道), Chengdong Subdistrict (城东街道)

Towns:

- Lunan (路南镇), Liushu (柳树镇), Laobian Town (老边镇), Erdaogou (二道沟镇)
