= D.R. Owen (shipwreck) =

Schooner that sank in Lake Superior

History
- Name: D.R. Owen
- Operator: W.R. Sutherland
- Port of registry: United States
- Laid down: September 8, 1874
- Fate: Sank east of Ashland, near the mouth of the Bad River
- Notes: Considered the first shipwreck of the Chequamegon Bay area

General characteristics
- Type: Schooner
- Length: 100 feet (30 m)

D.R. Owen was a schooner, leased by W. R. Sutherland, for hauling lumber. She sank on September 8, 1874, and is generally considered the first shipwreck in the Chequamegon Bay area of Lake Superior.

== History ==
During the early part of the 1870s Ashland was a small settlement, surrounded by a heavily wooded wilderness. Seeing the potential to make money in the future logging activity of the area, W.R. Sutherland founded the Ashland Lumber Company, the first sawmill in Ashland. (Note: this company should not be confused with a later business of the same name, of which Sutherland was not involved.) A good portion of Sutherland's business consisted of transporting lumber to Isle Royale, which had no sawmill of its own. The D.R. Owen was leased to transport lumber to the island.

On the morning of Thursday, September 6, 1874, the Owen left the island after delivering a load of lumber. However, an extremely rough storm was soon encountered. Poor visibility, strong winds and rough waters proved to be very difficult for the crew. A leak was discovered in the hull, and the sails were completely wrecked by the violent winds.

The crew attempted to wait out the storm. Friday, September 7, came and went with little change in the stormy conditions. Finally, on Saturday morning, September 8, land appeared on the horizon. The Apostle Islands were spotted, meaning the storm at least had blown the water-logged ship in the right direction. By that afternoon, the ship reached an area east of Ashland, near the mouth of the Bad River, where she sank. The crew survived.

== See also ==
- List of shipwrecks in the Great Lakes
- Apostle Islands
