= Xishi District =

Coordinates: 40°39′58″N 122°12′23″E

Xishi 西市区
- District
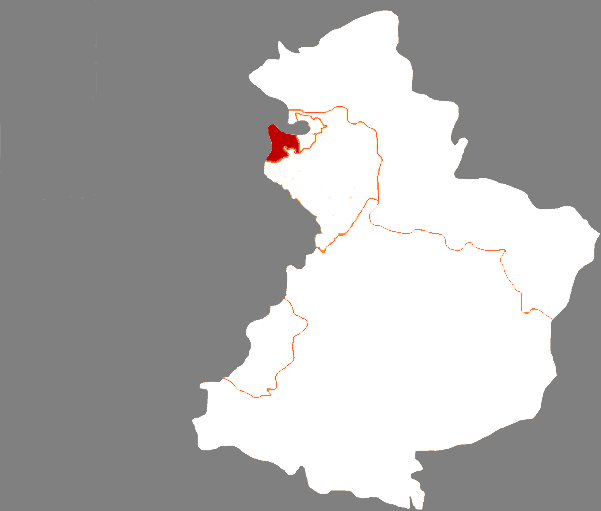
- Xishi in Yingkou

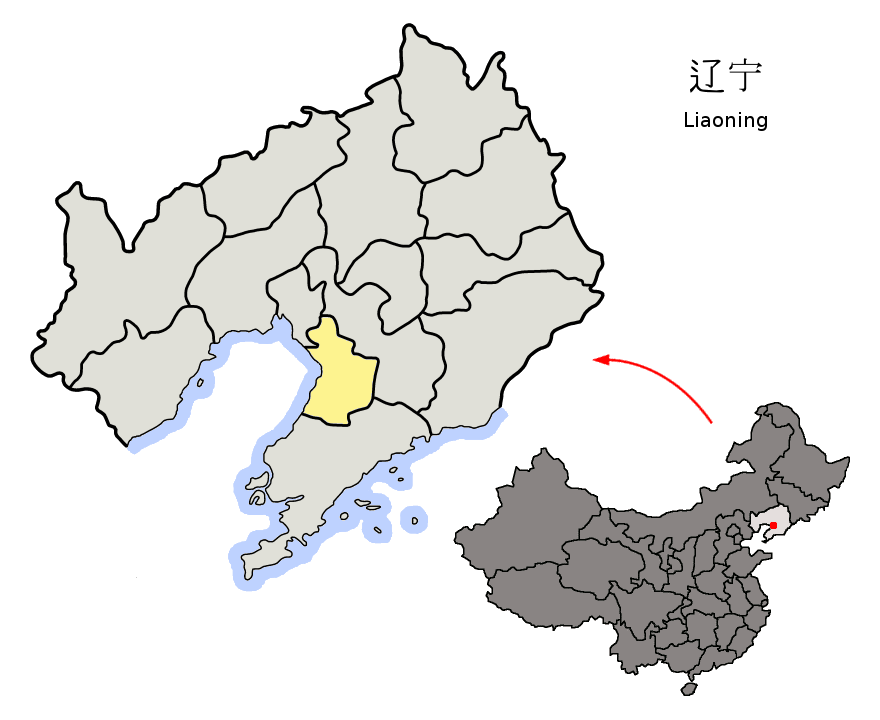
- Yingkou in Liaoning
- Country: People's Republic of China
- Province: Liaoning
- Prefecture-level city: Yingkou

Area
  - Total: 268.3 km^{2} (103.6 sq mi)

Population (2020 census)
  - Total: 212,913
  - Density: 793.6/km^{2} (2,055/sq mi)
- Time zone: UTC+8 (China Standard)

Xishi District (simplified Chinese: 西市区; traditional Chinese: 西市區; pinyin: Xīshì Qū; lit. 'West City District') is a district of the city of Yingkou, Liaoning province, People's Republic of China.

== Administrative divisions ==
There are seven subdistricts in the district: Wutaizi Subdistrict (五台子街道), Yushi Subdistrict (渔市街道), Desheng Subdistrict (得胜街道), Qinghua Subdistrict (清华街道), Hebei Subdistrict (河北街道), Shengli Subdistrict (胜利街道), Xishichang Subdistrict (西市场街道).
