= Yingkou =

Yingkou 营口市 Yingkow, Ingkow
- Prefecture-level city
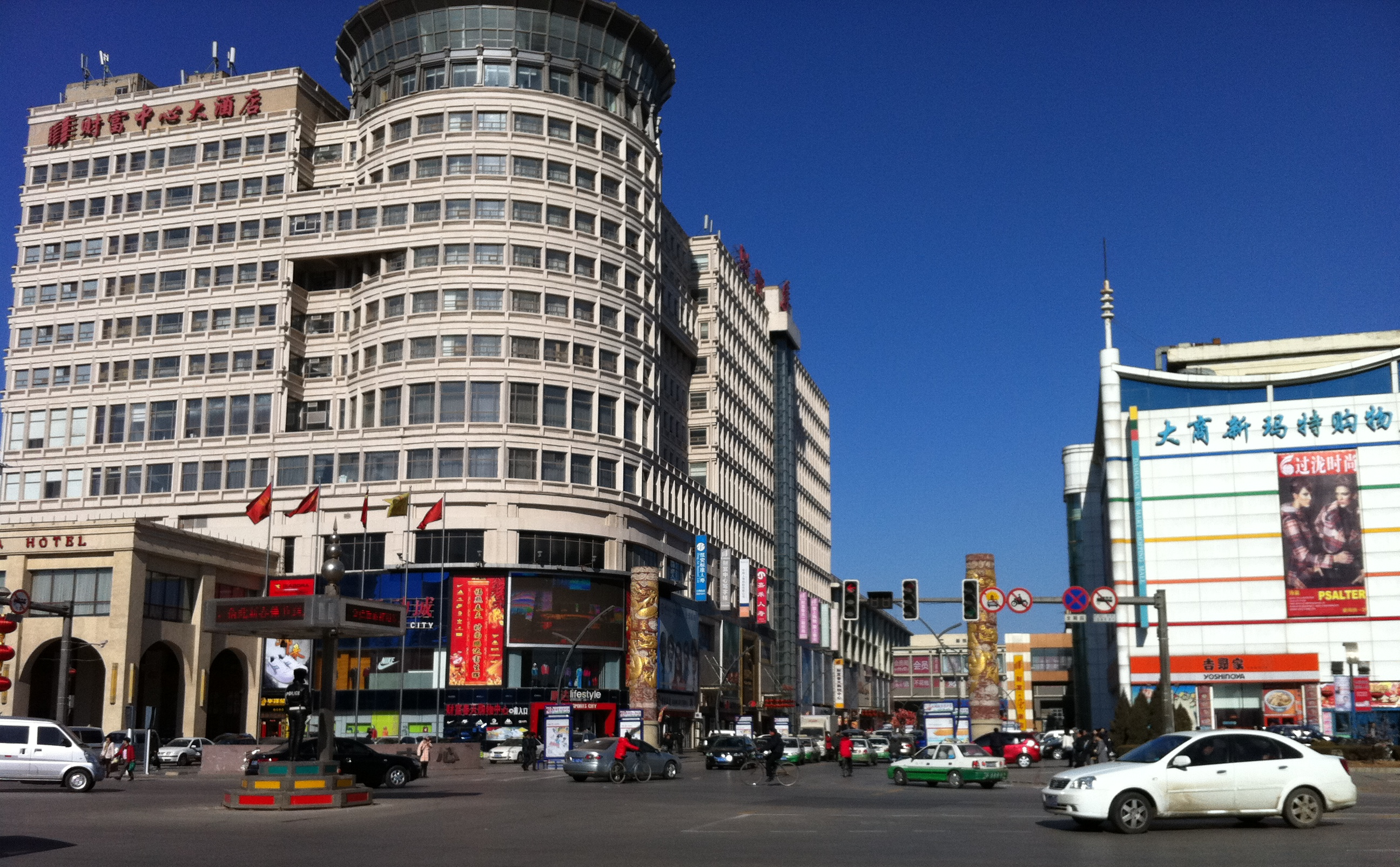
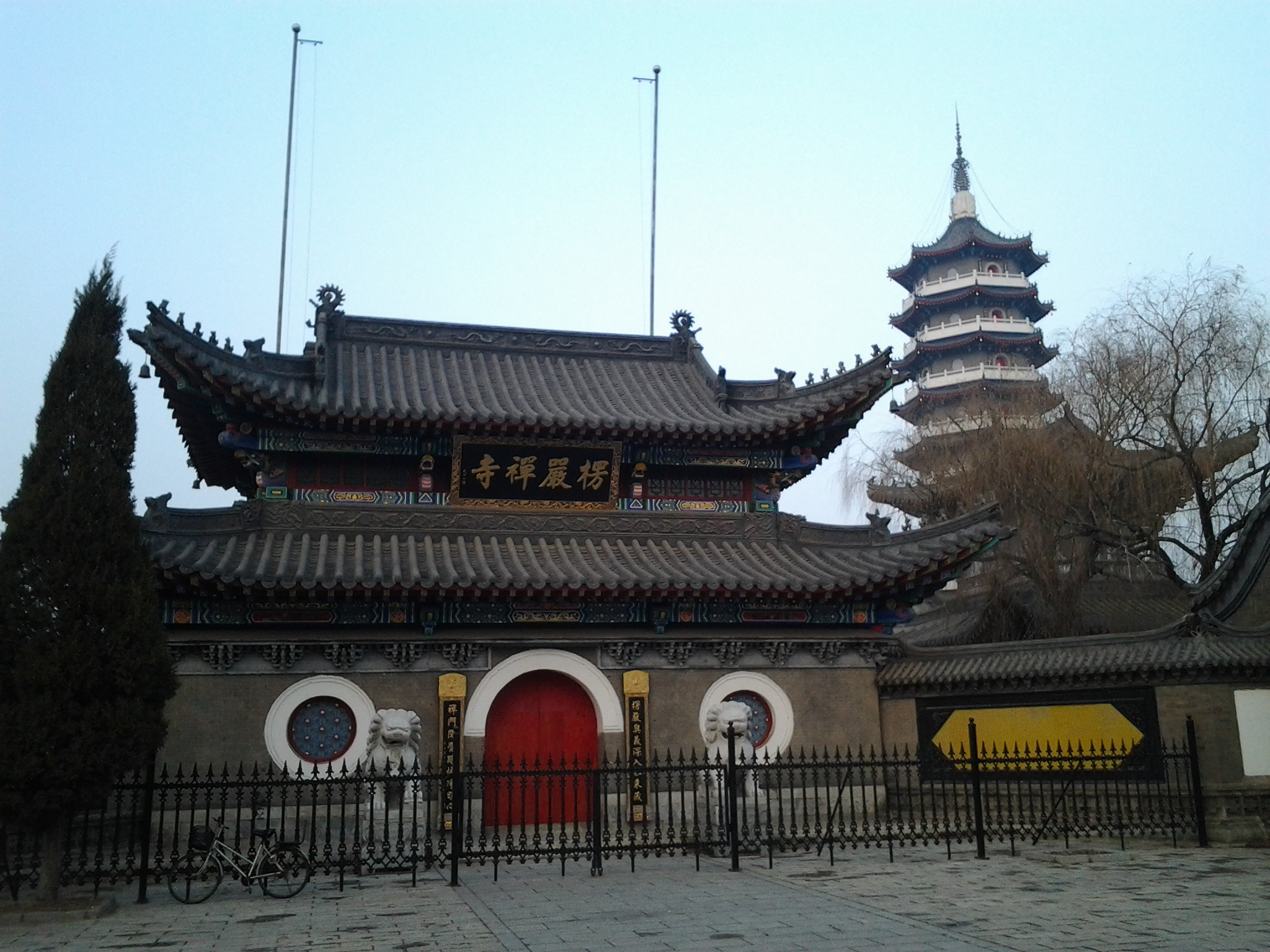
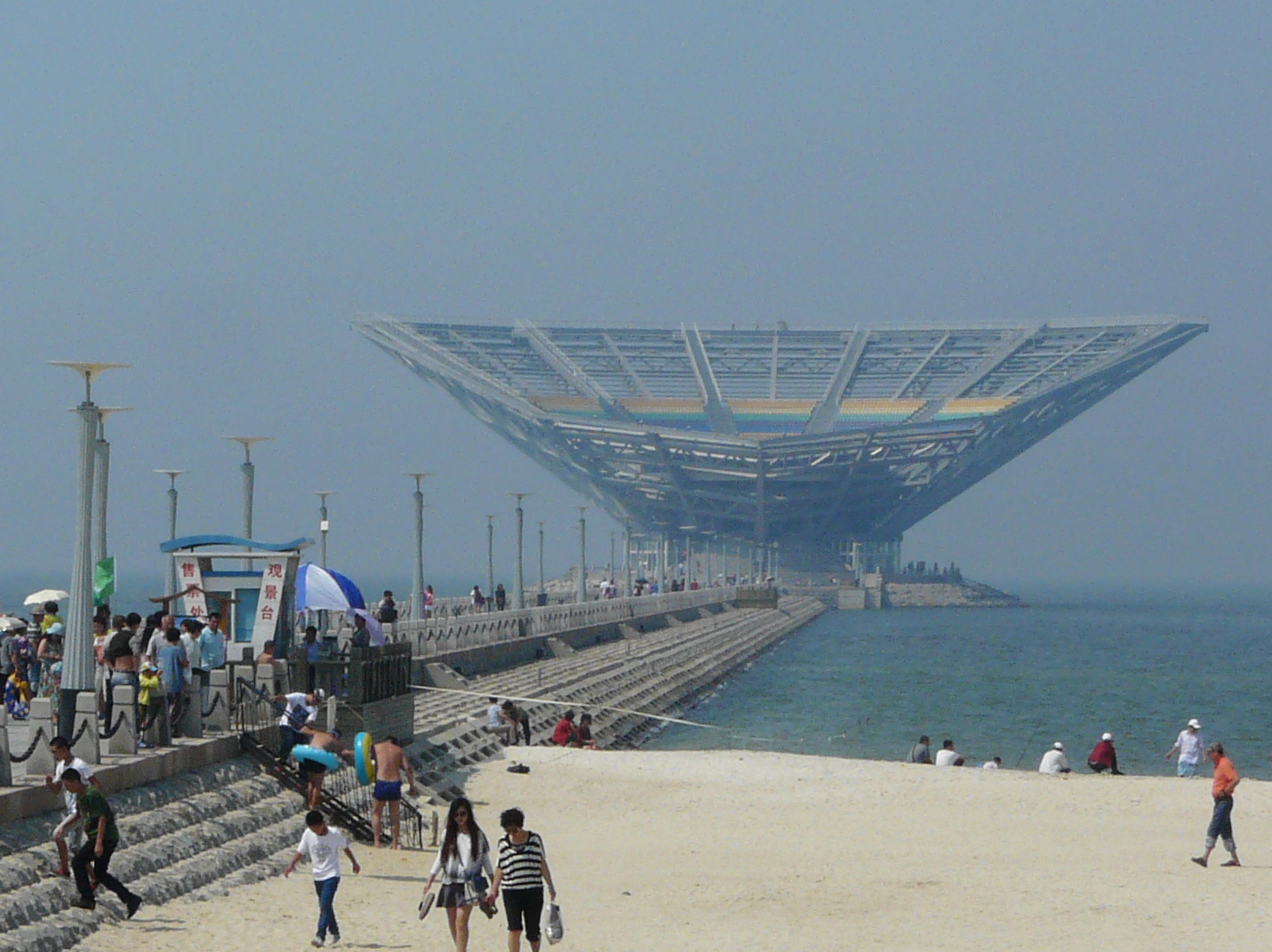
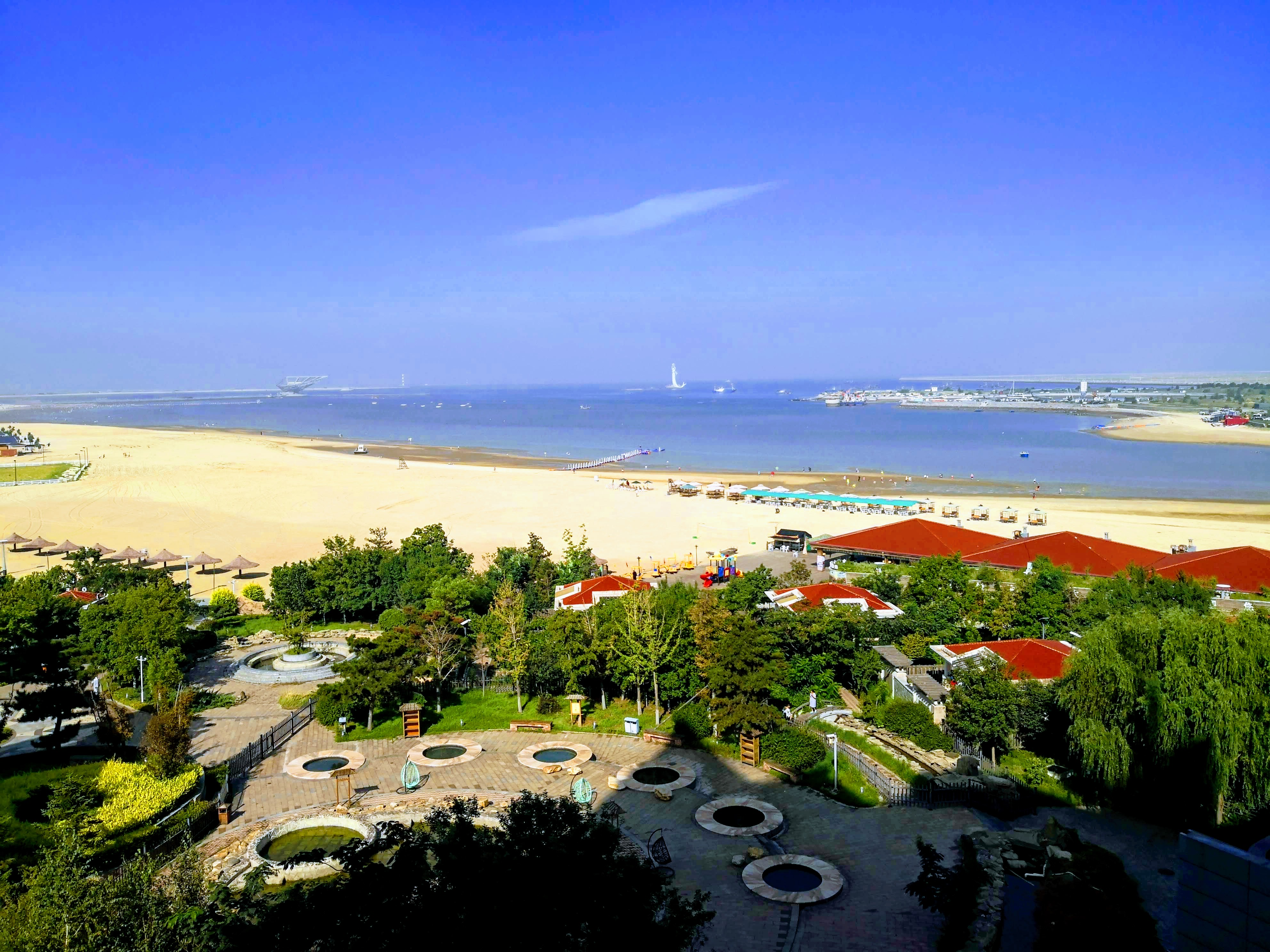
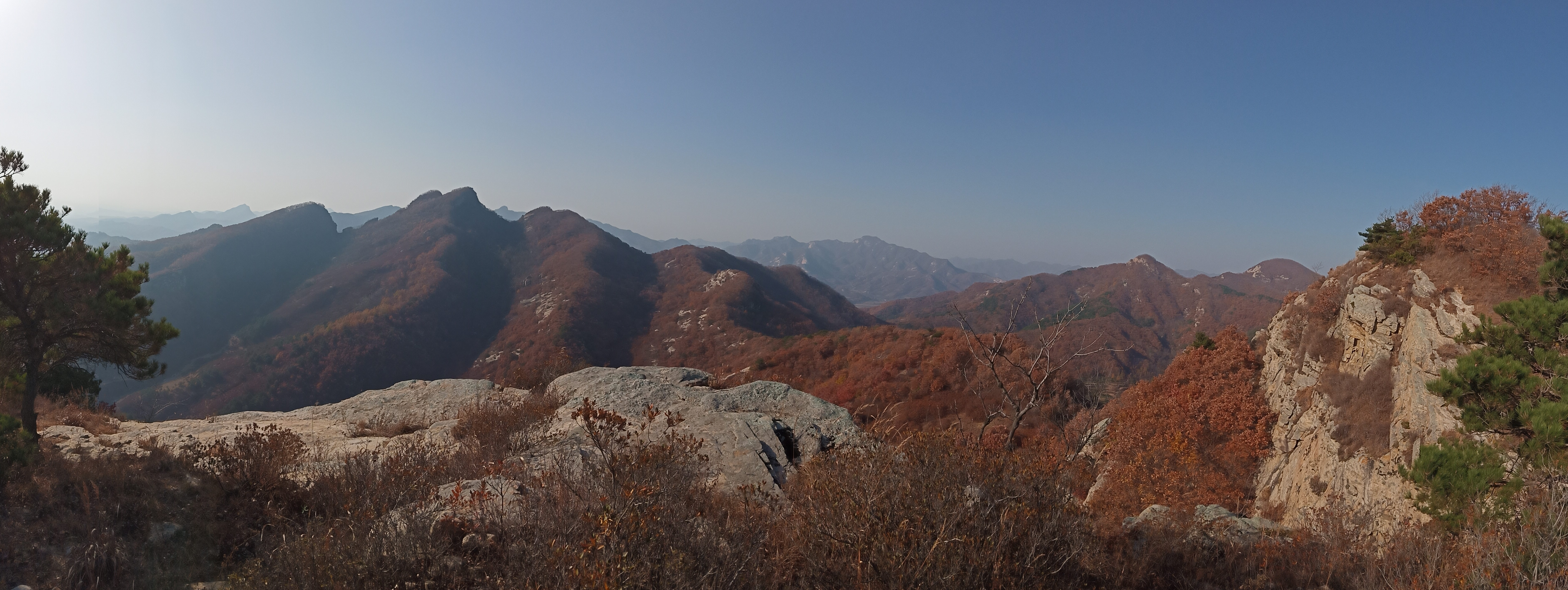
- From top, left to right: Xishi District, Lengyan Temple, Shanhai Plaza, Beach of Bayuquan, Red Mountain in Gaizhou

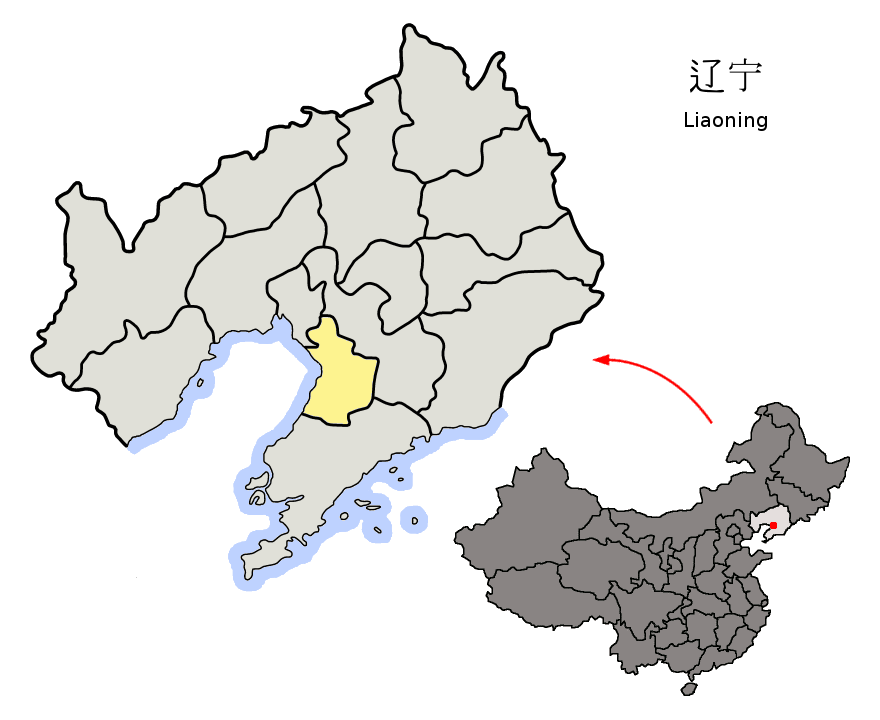
- Location of Yingkou City jurisdiction in Liaoning

- Location of the city centre in Liaoning
- Coordinates (Yingkou municipal government): 40°37′30″N 122°13′08″E
- Country: People's Republic of China
- Province: Liaoning
- Municipal seat: Xishi District
- Districts and Counties: List: Zhanqian District; Xishi District; Bayuquan District; Laobian District; Dashiqiao City; Gaizhou City

Government
  - CPC Yingkou: Committee Secretary
  - Mayor: Gao Jun

Area
  - Prefecture-level city: 5,502 km^{2} (2,124 sq mi)
  - Urban: 712.1 km^{2} (274.9 sq mi)
  - Metro: 1,913.2 km^{2} (738.7 sq mi)

Population (2020 census)
  - Prefecture-level city: 2,328,582
  - Density: 423.2/km^{2} (1,096/sq mi)
  - Urban: 1,162,213
  - Urban density: 1,632/km^{2} (4,227/sq mi)
  - Metro: 1,228,198
  - Metro density: 641.96/km^{2} (1,662.7/sq mi)

GDP
  - Prefecture-level city: CN¥ 151.4 billion US$ 24.3 billion
  - Per capita: CN¥ 61,925; US$ 9,942
- Time zone: UTC+8 (China Standard)
- Postal code: 115000
- Area code: 410
- ISO 3166 code: CN-LN-08
- Licence plates: 辽H
- Administrative division code: 210800
- Website: www.yingkou.gov.cn

Yingkou (Chinese: 营口; pinyin: Yíngkǒu) is a coastal prefecture-level city of central southern Liaoning province, People's Republic of China, on the northeastern shore of Liaodong Bay. It is the third-smallest prefecture level city in Liaoning with a total area of 5,502 square kilometres (2,124 sq mi), and the ninth most populous with a population of 2,328,582 as of the 2020 census, of whom 1,228,198 lived in the built-up (or metro) area made of three urban districts (Zhanqian, Xishi and Laobian) and one county-level city (Dashiqiao). It borders the sub-provincial city of Dalian to the south, the prefectural cities of Anshan to the north and east and Panjin to the northwest, and also shares maritime boundaries with Jinzhou and Huludao across the Liaodong Bay to its west.

Located on the east bank of the Daliao River mouth, Yingkou is an important port city, with the Port of Yingkou being the second-largest container port in the Bohai Sea (after the Port of Tianjin) and Northeast China (after the Port of Dalian), the tenth-largest nationwide, and the 25th-busiest worldwide. Yingkou is classified as a Medium-Port Metropolis.

== Name ==
Yingkou was historically known as Newchwang (Chinese: 牛庄; pinyin: Niúzhuāng; Manchu: Ishangga gašan hoton) in postal romanization; it was one of the Treaty Ports opened under the Treaties of Tianjin of 1858. In fact, the actual town of Newchwang was about thirty miles upstream of Liao He, within today's county-level city of Haicheng. After the treaty had been signed, the British found that the river near Newchwang was too shallow for their ships. Instead, the treaty port was moved to the area nearer to the river mouth where today's Yingkou is located.

To avoid confusion between the two locations, careful English writers of the early 20th century would sometimes use Newchwang for Yingkou (explaining that "Ying-kow, ... outside Manchuria, ... is known only as Newchwang") and Niu-chuang (the proper Wade–Giles transcription of '牛庄') for the actual inland Niuzhuang Town. Meanwhile, Newchwangcheng (牛庄城; postal: Newchwang Town) was adopted by the government as the inland town's name to distinguish it from the coastal city.

== Administrative divisions ==
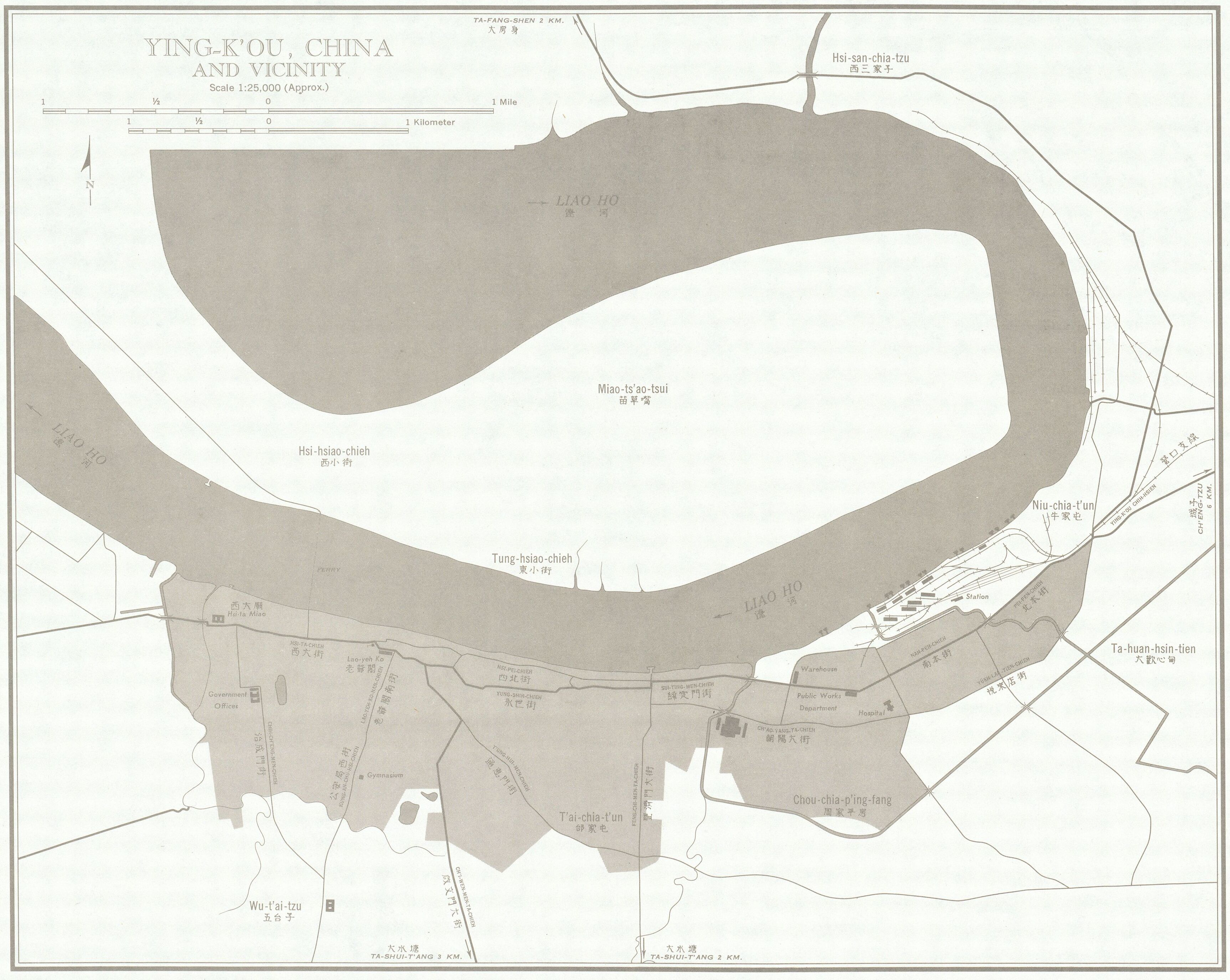
Map of Yingkou (labeled as YING-K'OU) (AMS, 1956)

Yingkou prefecture is subdivided into 4 districts and 2 cities:

Map
Name	Chinese (S)	Hanyu Pinyin	Population (2010)	Area (km^{2})	Density (/km^{2})
City Proper
Zhanqian District	站前区	Zhànqián Qū	310,634	36.35	8,545.64
Xishi District	西市区	Xīshì Qū	164,873	314.91	523.56
Laobian District	老边区	Lǎobiān Qū	125,454	217.54	576.69
Suburban
Bayuquan District	鲅鱼圈区	Bàyúquān Qū	431,087	280.86	1534.88
Satellite cities (County-level cities)
Dashiqiao City	大石桥市	Dàshíqiáo Shì	704,891	1,612.11	437.25
Gaizhou City	盖州市	Gàizhōu Shì	691,595	2,953.92	234.13
Total			2,428,534	5,415.68	448.43

== Geography ==
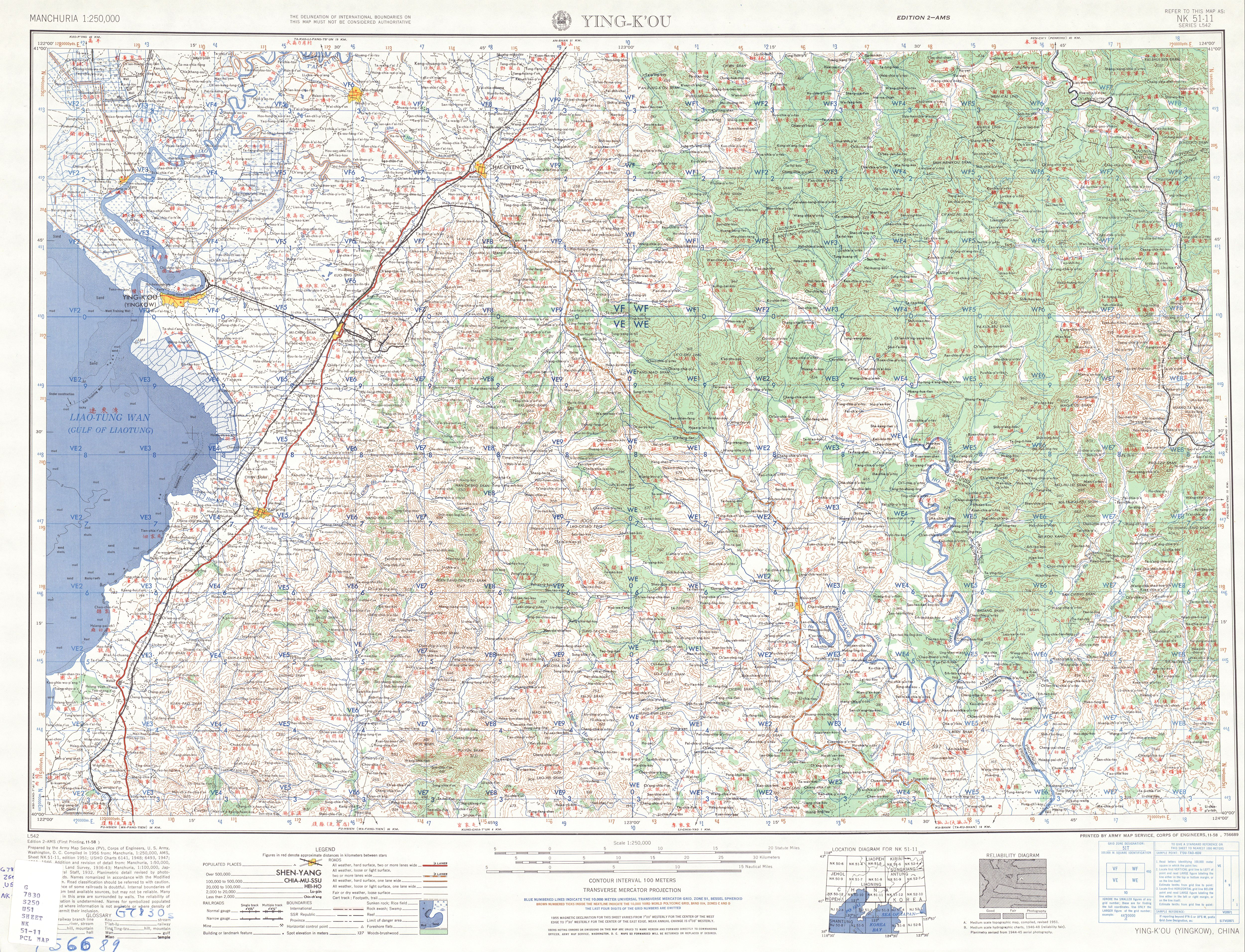
Yingkou (labelled as YING-K'OU (YINGKOW) 營口) (1956)

Yingkou

Climate chart (precipitation, max. and min. temperature)
J	F	M	A	M	J	J	A	S	O	N	D
6.2 −3 −13	6.7 1 −9	14 7 −2	34 16 6	53 22 13	69 26 19	169 29 22	166 28 21	55 24 15	40 17 7	20 7 −2	7.7 −1 −9
- █ Average max. and min. temperatures in °C
- █ Precipitation totals in mm
Imperial conversion
J	F	M	A	M	J	J	A	S	O	N	D
0.2 26 9	0.3 33 16	0.5 45 29	1.4 60 44	2.1 71 56	2.7 79 65	6.6 83 72	6.5 83 70	2.2 76 59	1.6 62 45	0.8 44 28	0.3 31 15
- █ Average max. and min. temperatures in °F
- █ Precipitation totals in inches

Yingkou is mostly located in the northwestern part of the Liaodong Peninsula, and on the left bank of the mouth of Daliao River, which was historically the main distributary of the lower Liao River and the principal exit of fluvial transports from inland Liaoning into the Bohai Sea.

The city's metro area is located 166 km (103 mi) south from the provincial capital Shenyang, 204 km (127 mi) north from Dalian, 84 kilometres (52 mi) southwest from Anshan, and 70 km (43 mi) southeast from Panjin. The city is located at latitude 39° 55'−40° 56' N and longitude 121° 56'−123° 02' E. At its greatest width, the city spans 111.8 km (69.5 mi) from north to south and 50.7 km (31.5 mi) from east to west. The total area of the city is 5,365 km^{2} (2,071 sq mi), occupying a mere 4.9% of the provincial area. The city has a total coastline of 96 km (60 mi).

=== Climate ===
Yingkou has a four-season humid continental climate (Köppen Dwa) with strong monsoonal influences. Though the climate is somewhat tempered by the city's location on the Bohai Gulf, winters are long, windy, cold but dry, and summers are hot and humid. The monthly 24-hour average temperature ranges from −8.3 °C (17.1 °F) in January to 25.1 °C (77.2 °F) in July, while the annual mean is 9.82 °C (49.7 °F). Precipitation is somewhat enhanced by the coastal location, with a majority of the annual rainfall occurring in July and August alone. With monthly percent possible sunshine ranging from 51% in July to 68% in three months, the city receives 2,774 hours of bright sunshine annually.

Climate data for Yingkou, elevation 4 m (13 ft), (1991–2020 normals, extremes 1951–present)
Month	Jan	Feb	Mar	Apr	May	Jun	Jul	Aug	Sep	Oct	Nov	Dec	Year
Record high °C (°F)	6.5 (43.7)	15.4 (59.7)	20.4 (68.7)	28.5 (83.3)	33.2 (91.8)	34.0 (93.2)	35.3 (95.5)	35.1 (95.2)	31.6 (88.9)	27.4 (81.3)	20.5 (68.9)	12.0 (53.6)	35.3 (95.5)
Mean daily maximum °C (°F)	−3.0 (26.6)	0.9 (33.6)	7.5 (45.5)	15.8 (60.4)	22.2 (72.0)	26.1 (79.0)	28.8 (83.8)	28.5 (83.3)	24.3 (75.7)	16.8 (62.2)	7.1 (44.8)	−0.5 (31.1)	14.5 (58.2)
Daily mean °C (°F)	−7.9 (17.8)	−3.8 (25.2)	2.9 (37.2)	11.0 (51.8)	17.6 (63.7)	22.3 (72.1)	25.4 (77.7)	24.7 (76.5)	19.6 (67.3)	11.9 (53.4)	2.6 (36.7)	−5.1 (22.8)	10.1 (50.2)
Mean daily minimum °C (°F)	−12.1 (10.2)	−8.2 (17.2)	−1.3 (29.7)	6.7 (44.1)	13.5 (56.3)	18.8 (65.8)	22.4 (72.3)	21.5 (70.7)	15.3 (59.5)	7.3 (45.1)	−1.5 (29.3)	−9.1 (15.6)	6.1 (43.0)
Record low °C (°F)	−28.4 (−19.1)	−25.3 (−13.5)	−21.9 (−7.4)	−5.8 (21.6)	1.4 (34.5)	5.6 (42.1)	14.8 (58.6)	12.1 (53.8)	2.4 (36.3)	−7.6 (18.3)	−23.7 (−10.7)	−24.1 (−11.4)	−28.4 (−19.1)
Average precipitation mm (inches)	4.3 (0.17)	6.5 (0.26)	11.8 (0.46)	32.3 (1.27)	53.2 (2.09)	69.3 (2.73)	151.3 (5.96)	163.1 (6.42)	49.7 (1.96)	41.6 (1.64)	23.8 (0.94)	8.2 (0.32)	615.1 (24.22)
Average precipitation days (≥ 0.1 mm)	2.6	2.4	3.3	5.9	7.5	9.6	9.9	9.1	6.4	5.9	4.8	3.2	70.6
Average snowy days	3.4	3.3	2.7	0.7	0	0	0	0	0	0.2	3.1	3.8	17.2
Average relative humidity (%)	62	58	56	56	61	71	78	79	71	66	63	63	65
Mean monthly sunshine hours	194.5	196.8	240.8	249.2	277.8	244.8	217.6	229.0	237.3	219.3	179.4	175.9	2,662.4
Percentage possible sunshine	65	65	65	62	62	54	48	54	64	64	61	61	60
Source: China Meteorological Administrationextremes

== Industrial zones ==
- China Minmetals (Yingkou) industrial park
- Yingkou Economic & Technological Development Zone. So far, five key industries have been formed, which are steel, chemical industry, mineral processing, logistics, textile and garment industry.

== Transportation ==
Yingkou is served by the Yingkou Lanqi Airport.

== Sport ==
The city is home to the basketball club Liaoning Flying Leopards of the Chinese Basketball Association. The club brought forth several players of China's national basketball team. It plays its home games at the Benxi Gymnasium.

== Notable residents ==
- Boris Blacher

== Partnership town and ports ==
- Jacksonville, Florida, United States — twinned since 1990.
- Tver, Russia — twinned since 1994.
- Yingkou Port signed a Sister Port agreement with the Hamilton Port Authority of Hamilton, Ontario, Canada in November 2005.
