= Red flag =

Red flag may refer to:

== Signs and warnings ==
- Red flag (American slavery), signal of an upcoming slave sale
- Red flag warning, issued by the National Weather Service in the United States
- Bloody flag, maritime flag signaling an intention to give battle with no quarter (fight to the death)
- Racing flags § Red flag, signaling the conditions that are too dangerous to continue the race
- Red flag in gridiron football
- Red flag used by a railway conductor

== Politics ==
- Red flag (politics), predominantly a symbol of left-wing ideologies
  - Flag of the Soviet Union, known as the Red Banner
- Red Flag Party, a communist party in Venezuela
- Peruvian Communist Party (Marxist–Leninist), originally Peruvian Communist Party – Red Flag
- Communist Organization of Spain (Red Flag)
- Communist Party (Burma), or Red Flag Communist Party
- Communist Party of India (Marxist–Leninist) Red Flag
- Marxist-Leninist Party of India (Red Flag)

== Law ==
- Red flag law, a state law in the US that allows temporary confiscation of firearms
- Red flag traffic laws, in the UK and US in the 19th century affecting drivers of early automobiles
  - "Red Flag Act", a Locomotive Act, the 19th-century British road law
- Red Flags Rule, to help prevent identity theft in the US

== Arts, entertainment and media ==
=== Film and television ===
- Red Flag, a 2012 film starring Alex Karpovsky
- Red Flag: The Ultimate Game, a 1981 TV film starring Barry Bostwick
- "Red Flag", an episode of Chicago Fire
- "Red Flag", an episode of Jericho
- "Red Flag", an episode of the TV documentary series People's Century
- Red Flag, fictional group in Alphas

=== Literature ===
- Red Flag (magazine), published by the Chinese Communist Party
- Red Flag (newspaper), by the Trotskyist organisation Socialist Alternative in Australia
- Shimbun Akahata ('Newspaper Red Flag'), of the Japanese Communist Party
- Bandera Roja (La Paz), a socialist newspaper in Bolivia of the 1920s
- Die Rote Fahne ('The Red Flag'), a German communist newspaper created on 9 November 1918 by Karl Liebknecht and Rosa Luxemburg

=== Music ===
- Red Flag (band), a synthpop band founded in 1984
- Red Flag (album), by All Saints, 2016

- "The Red Flag", a socialist song
- "Bandiera Rossa" ('Red Flag'), a song of the Italian labour movement
- "The Standard of Revolt" (French: Le drapeau rouge 'the red flag'), a French socialist song
- "Red Flag" (song), by Billy Talent, 2006
- "Red Flags" (song), by Mimi Webb, 2023
- "Red Flags", a 2023 song by Josh Ross
- "Red Flags", a 2023 song by Plain White T's
- "Red Flag", a song by Slipknot from the 2019 album We Are Not Your Kind
- "Red Flag", a song by Gwen Stefani from the 2016 album This Is What the Truth Feels Like
- "Red Flag", a song by Kesha from the 2025 album Period
- "Red Flag Day", a song by U2 from the 2017 album Songs of Experience
- "Red Flags", a song by Chris Brown from the 2023 album 11:11
- "Red Flags", a song by Tinashe from the 2024 album Quantum Baby
- "Red Flags", a song by Tom Cardy and Montaigne from the 2022 album Big Dumb Idiot
- "Red Flag", a song by BiC Fizzle, BigWalkDog, and Gucci Mane from the 2022 album So Icy Boyz 22

== Other uses ==
- Red Flag Group, a compliance risk firm in Hong Kong
- Red Flag Linux, software
- Red Flag Publishing House, a book publisher based in China
- Exercise Red Flag, a series of United States Air Force training exercises
  - Red Flag – Alaska
- Red Flag, several classes of locomotives by Kim Chong-t'ae Electric Locomotive Works, in North Korea
- Charles E. Taylor (politician), known as "Red Flag" Taylor, an American politician
- Red flag, a common name for Iris fulva, a flowering plant endemic to the southern and central United States

== See also ==
- Hongqi (disambiguation) ('Red Flag' in Chinese)
- Jolly Roger, a pirate flag
- Red Flag riots, in Brisbane, Australia 1918–19
