= Dongfeng =

Dongfeng is the romanization of several Chinese names of which most notably "East Wind" (simplified Chinese: 东风; traditional Chinese: 東風). Dongfeng may refer to:

== People's Republic of China ==
- Dongfeng (missile) (Chinese: 东风导弹), series of ballistic missiles of the People's Liberation Army
- Chinese series of diesel locomotives
  - China Railways DF
  - DF4
  - DF8
  - Dongfeng DMU
- Dongfeng Motor Corporation (Chinese: 东风汽车公司), automobile company and its subsidiaries and joint ventures

=== Administrative divisions ===
- Dongfeng County (Chinese: 东丰县), Liaoyuan City, Jilin Province
- Dongfeng District (Chinese: 东风区), Jia Mu Si City, Heilongjiang Province
- Dongfeng Town (disambiguation), for towns named Dongfeng nationwide

Neighborhoods (Chinese: 东风街道)

- Dongfeng Subdistrict, Bengbu, in Longzihu District, Bengbu, Anhui
- Dongfeng Subdistrict, Beijing, in Fangshan District
- Dongfeng Subdistrict, Guangzhou, in Yuexiu District
- Dongfeng Subdistrict, Baoding, in Beishi District, Baoding, Hebei
- Dongfeng Subdistrict, Shijiazhuang, in Qiaodong District
- Dongfeng Subdistrict, Daqing, in Sartu District, Daqing, Heilongjiang
- Dongfeng Subdistrict, Jixi, in Jiguan District, Jixi, Heilongjiang
- Dongfeng Subdistrict, Qitaihe, in Qiezihe District, Qitaihe, Heilongjiang
- Dongfeng Subdistrict, Shangqiu, in Liangyuan District, Shangqiu, Henan
- Dongfeng Subdistrict, Zhumadian, in Yicheng District, Zhumadian, Henan
- Dongfeng Subdistrict, Xiangyang, in Fancheng District, Xiangyang, Hubei
- Dongfeng Subdistrict, Changchun, in Luyuan District, Changchun, Jilin
- Dongfeng Subdistrict, Benxi, in Xihu District, Benxi, Liaoning
- Dongfeng Subdistrict, Panjin, in Shuangtaizi District, Panjin, Liaoning
- Dongfeng Subdistrict, Yingkou, in Zhanqian District, Yingkou, Liaoning
- Dongfeng Subdistrict, Jinan, in Licheng District

Townships and Villagae

- Dongfeng Township, Shanxi (Chinese: 董封乡), in Yangcheng County
- Dongfeng Township, Beijing (Chinese: 东风地区)
- Dongfeng Township, Anyang, in Long'an District, Anyang, Henan
- Dongfeng Township, Dancheng County, Henan
- Dongfeng Township, Zhuzhou, in Yanling County, Hunan
- Dongfeng Township, Yizhang County, Hunan
- Dongfeng Township, Jilin, in Taobei District, Baicheng
- Dongfeng, a village in Xinghua Township, Hong'an County, Huanggang, Hubei

== People ==
- Dong Feng (physician) (Chinese: 董奉), Eastern Han physician
- Dong Feng (weightlifter), Chinese weightlifter

== Taiwan ==
- Azio TV (Chinese: 東風衛視), satellite capable operated by Era Television

== See also ==
- Dongfang (disambiguation)
