= Czerwony Sztandar =

Czerwony Sztandar (English: "Red Banner", "Red flag") may refer to:

- Czerwony Sztandar (Lviv newspaper) (1939-1941), Lviv, Ukraine
- Czerwony Sztandar (Vilnius) (1953-1990), Polish-language newspaper in Lithuanian SSR
- Czerwony Sztandar (song) The title of the Polish version of the French revolutionary song The Standard of Revolt
