= Dongfeng Town =

Dongfeng could refer to the following towns in China:

- Dongfeng, Chao'an County (东凤镇), Guangdong
- Dongfeng, Zhongshan (东凤镇), Guangdong
- Dongfeng, Dongfeng County (东丰镇), Jilin

Written as "东风镇":

- Dongfeng, Guiyang, in Wudang District, Guiyang, Guizhou
- Dongfeng, Weining County, in Weining Yi, Hui, and Miao Autonomous County, Guizhou
- Dongfeng, Hailun, Heilongjiang
- Dongfeng, Ejin Banner, Inner Mongolia
- Dongfeng, Kailu County, Inner Mongolia
- Dongfeng, Dawa County, Liaoning
- Dongfeng, Shaanxi, in Long County
