= Zhejiang Online =

Chinese news website

Founded in December 2002, Zhejiang Online (Chinese: 浙江在线) or ZJOL, Zhejiang Online News, is the only provincial official news site and comprehensive portal of Zhejiang.

== History ==
Zhejiang Online, previously recognized as the Zhejiang Daily Press Group's internet platform, is affiliated with the Foreign Publicity Office of Zhejiang Province, China Zhejiang Net, and the Zhejiang Radio and Television Group's Zhejiang Television website. Zhejiang Online is the newly established provincial mainstream media following Zhejiang Daily, Zhejiang Radio, and Zhejiang TV. Completion of the firm restructuring into the Zhejiang Daily Press Group management occurred at the end of 2010. The website offers an extensive array of current news, alongside digital newspapers, mobile newspapers, SMS updates, interactive live broadcasts, forums, blogs, microblogs, online surveys, comprehensive text searches, digital printing, on-demand multimedia, and classified information queries, including text, images, video, audio, and other integrated online information services.
