= Panshan County =

Panshan 盘山县
- County
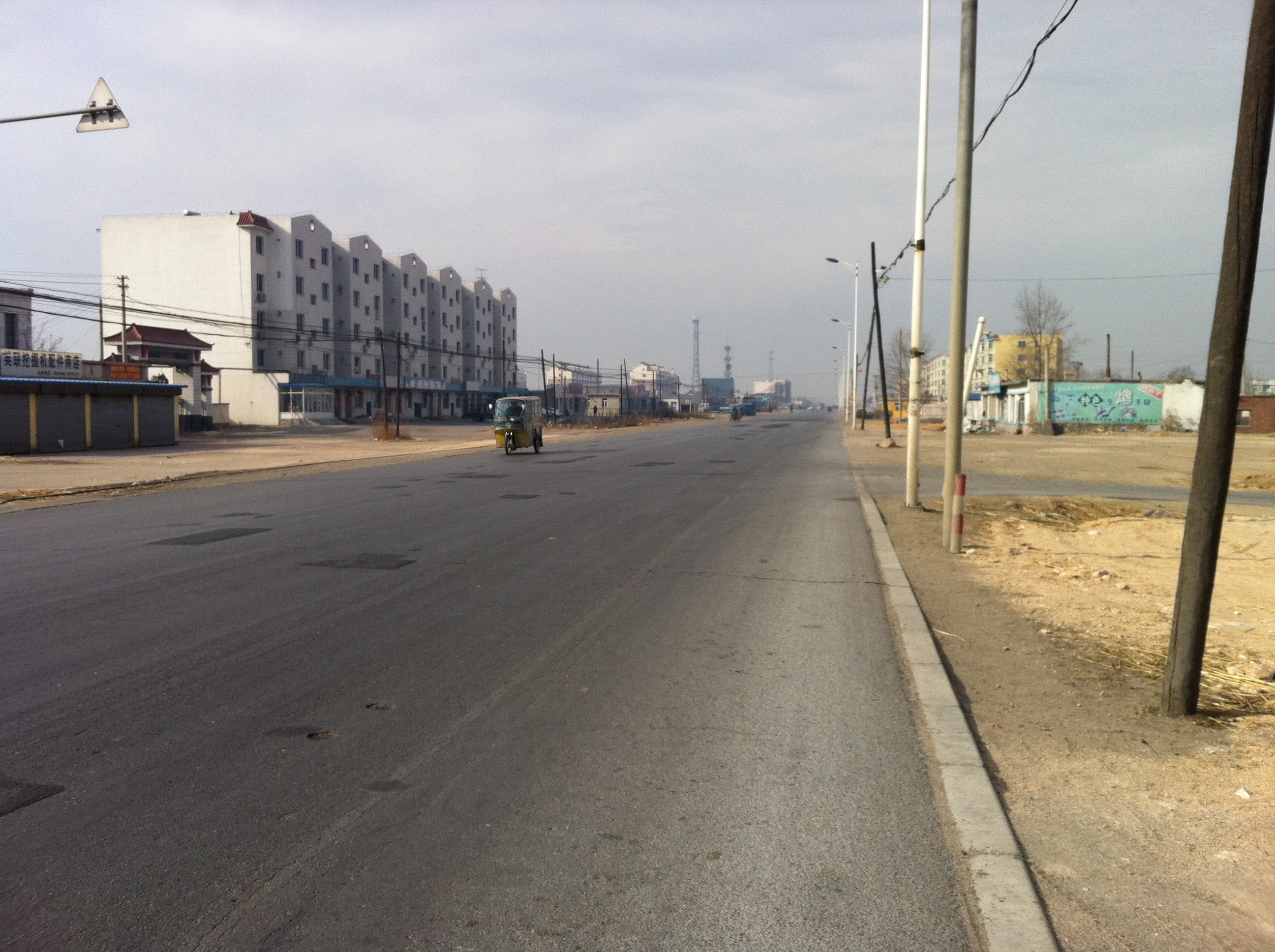

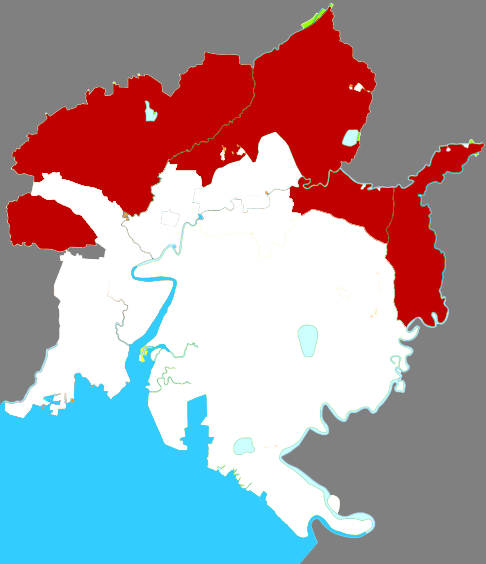
- Panshan in Panjin

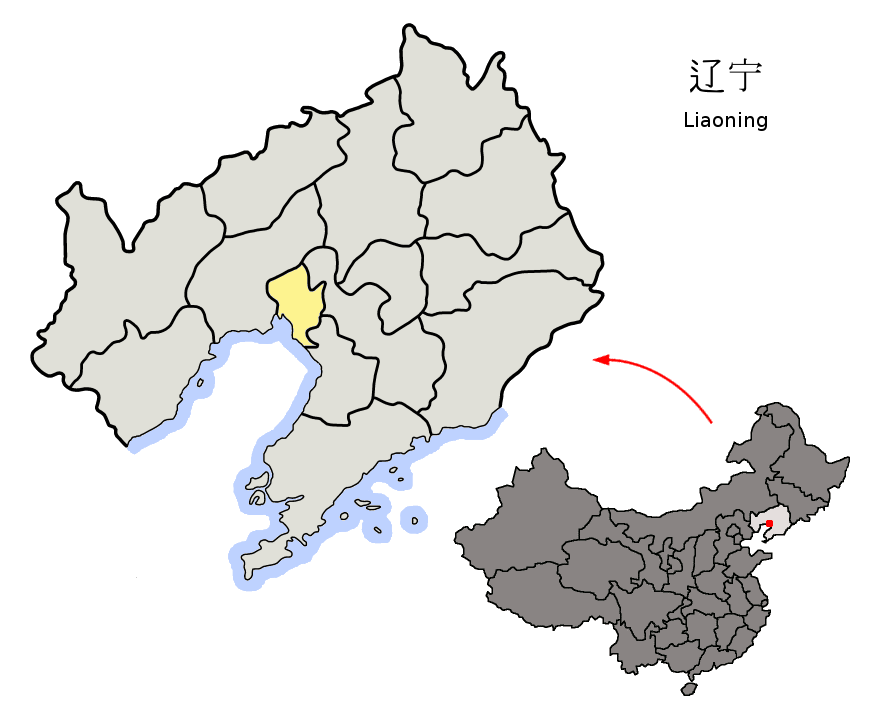
- Panjin in Liaoning
- Coordinates (Panshan County government): 41°14′35″N 121°59′46″E
- Country: People's Republic of China
- Province: Liaoning
- Prefecture-level city: Panjin

Area
  - Total: 2,145 km^{2} (828 sq mi)

Population (2020 census)
  - Total: 223,210
  - Density: 104.1/km^{2} (269.5/sq mi)
- Time zone: UTC+8 (China Standard)

Panshan County (simplified Chinese: 盘山县; traditional Chinese: 盤山縣; pinyin: Pánshān Xiàn) is a county in the central part of Liaoning province, China. It is under the administration of the prefecture-level city of Panjin and occupies its northern third. The county has a total area of 2,145 square kilometres (828 sq mi), and a population of approximately 223,210 people in 2020. The county's postal code is 124000, and the county government is located in Shuangtaizi District.

== Administrative divisions ==
Panshan County administers nine towns and five rural townships.

Towns:

- Taiping (太平镇), Hujia (胡家镇), Gaosheng (高升镇), Guchengzi (古城子镇), Shaling (沙岭镇), Baqiangzi (坝墙子镇), Yangjuanzi (羊圈子镇), Dongguo (东郭镇), Shixin (石新镇), Wujia (吴家镇)

Townships:

- Lujia Township (陆家乡), Tianshui Township (甜水乡), Dahuang Township (大荒乡), Chenjia Township (陈家乡)

== Climate ==
Climate data for Panshan, elevation 5 m (16 ft), (1991–2020 normals, extremes 1981–2026)
| Month | Jan | Feb | Mar | Apr | May | Jun | Jul | Aug | Sep | Oct | Nov | Dec | Year |
|---|---|---|---|---|---|---|---|---|---|---|---|---|---|
| Record high °C (°F) | 6.7 (44.1) | 14.8 (58.6) | 26.8 (80.2) | 28.2 (82.8) | 31.8 (89.2) | 33.9 (93.0) | 35.5 (95.9) | 34.6 (94.3) | 31.7 (89.1) | 28.1 (82.6) | 19.8 (67.6) | 11.5 (52.7) | 35.5 (95.9) |
| Mean daily maximum °C (°F) | −3.1 (26.4) | 1.1 (34.0) | 7.7 (45.9) | 16.2 (61.2) | 22.8 (73.0) | 26.3 (79.3) | 28.6 (83.5) | 28.4 (83.1) | 24.5 (76.1) | 16.7 (62.1) | 6.6 (43.9) | −1.0 (30.2) | 14.6 (58.2) |
| Daily mean °C (°F) | −8.8 (16.2) | −4.6 (23.7) | 2.2 (36.0) | 10.5 (50.9) | 17.5 (63.5) | 22.1 (71.8) | 25.0 (77.0) | 24.2 (75.6) | 19.0 (66.2) | 11.2 (52.2) | 1.6 (34.9) | −6.1 (21.0) | 9.5 (49.1) |
| Mean daily minimum °C (°F) | −13.5 (7.7) | −9.5 (14.9) | −2.5 (27.5) | 5.4 (41.7) | 12.7 (54.9) | 18.4 (65.1) | 21.8 (71.2) | 20.7 (69.3) | 14.3 (57.7) | 6.3 (43.3) | −2.6 (27.3) | −10.4 (13.3) | 5.1 (41.2) |
| Record low °C (°F) | −30.6 (−23.1) | −25.3 (−13.5) | −15.5 (4.1) | −7.9 (17.8) | 2.6 (36.7) | 8.5 (47.3) | 14.4 (57.9) | 10.7 (51.3) | 2.8 (37.0) | −6.3 (20.7) | −21.0 (−5.8) | −25.2 (−13.4) | −30.6 (−23.1) |
| Average precipitation mm (inches) | 3.2 (0.13) | 4.6 (0.18) | 10.6 (0.42) | 27.6 (1.09) | 51.4 (2.02) | 86.7 (3.41) | 155.1 (6.11) | 137.7 (5.42) | 52.9 (2.08) | 41.4 (1.63) | 17.1 (0.67) | 4.7 (0.19) | 593 (23.35) |
| Average precipitation days (≥ 0.1 mm) | 1.9 | 2.2 | 3.8 | 5.2 | 8.1 | 10.4 | 10.3 | 9.1 | 6.1 | 5.0 | 4.1 | 2.2 | 68.4 |
| Average snowy days | 2.7 | 2.9 | 2.5 | 0.7 | 0 | 0 | 0 | 0 | 0 | 0.2 | 2.7 | 2.9 | 14.6 |
| Average relative humidity (%) | 58 | 56 | 55 | 56 | 61 | 73 | 82 | 82 | 74 | 67 | 63 | 61 | 66 |
| Mean monthly sunshine hours | 205.6 | 207.2 | 249.5 | 246.3 | 266.6 | 221.1 | 186.1 | 206.8 | 228.5 | 210.2 | 180.7 | 186.5 | 2,595.1 |
| Percentage possible sunshine | 69 | 69 | 67 | 61 | 59 | 49 | 41 | 49 | 62 | 62 | 62 | 65 | 60 |
Source: China Meteorological Administration October all-time Record all-time February high
