= Hongqi Qu =

Hongqi Qu may refer to:

- Hongqi, Xinxiang (红旗区; Hóngqí Qū; "Red Flag District"), district in Xinxiang, Henan, China
- Red Flag Canal (红旗渠; Hóngqí Qú), irrigation canal in Linzhou, Henan, China

== See also ==
- Hongqi (disambiguation)
