= Dongfang =

Dōngfāng (simplified Chinese: 东方; traditional Chinese: 東方; lit. 'The East') may refer to:

- Dongfang Electric, a Chinese corporation engaged in the manufacturing of power generators
- Dongfang (surname), a Chinese compound surname
  - Dongfang Shuo
  - Dongfang Bubai
- Dongfang TV (aka Dragon TV), a Shanghai-based TV channel

== Locations in China ==
- Dongfang, Hainan, county-level city
- Dongfang Road, major street in Pudong, Shanghai
- Dongfang, Jinyun County, town in Jinyun County, Zhejiang

=== Subdistricts ===
- Dongfang Subdistrict, Shantou, in Jinping District, Shantou, Guangdong
- Dongfang Subdistrict, Shangqiu, in Suiyang District, Shangqiu, Henan
- Dongfang Subdistrict, Xiangcheng City, in Xiangcheng City, Henan

== See also ==
- China Orient Asset Management
- Orient Group
- Orient Securities
- Dongfeng (disambiguation)
- Toho (disambiguation) (Japanese equivalent)
