= Le Drapeau Rouge =

Le Drapeau Rouge may refer to:

- "The Standard of Revolt" (French: "Le drapeau rouge"), a French revolutionary song
- Le Drapeau rouge, a newspaper originally published by the Communist Party of Belgium and revived by the Communist Party of Belgium (1989)
