= Kailu County =

Kailu County 开鲁县 • ᠺᠠᠶᠢᠯᠦ ᠰᠢᠶᠠᠨ K'ai-lu
- County
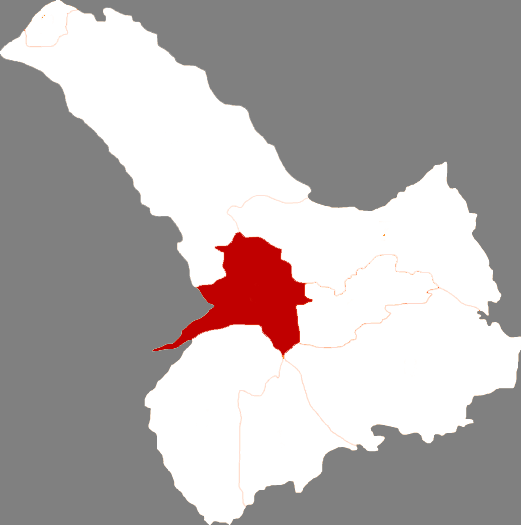
- Kailu in Tongliao

- Tongliao in Inner Mongolia

- Location in Inner Mongolia Kailu (China)
- Coordinates: 43°36′04″N 121°19′08″E
- Country: China
- Autonomous region: Inner Mongolia
- Prefecture-level city: Tongliao
- County seat: Kailu Town

Area
  - Total: 4,353.2 km^{2} (1,680.8 sq mi)

Population (2020)
  - Total: 313,364
  - Density: 71.985/km^{2} (186.44/sq mi)
- Time zone: UTC+8 (China Standard)
- Website: kailu.gov.cn

Kailu County

Chinese name
- Simplified Chinese: 开鲁县
- Traditional Chinese: 開魯縣
Transcriptions
Standard Mandarin
- Hanyu Pinyin: Kāilǔ Xiàn

Mongolian name
- Mongolian Cyrillic: Кайлу шянь
- Mongolian script: ᠺᠠᠶᠢᠯᠦ ᠰᠢᠶᠠᠨ
Transcriptions
- SASM/GNC: Ḵayilü siyan

Kailu County (Mongolian: ᠺᠠᠶᠢᠯᠦ ᠰᠢᠶᠠᠨ; Chinese: 开鲁县) is a county in the east of Inner Mongolia, China. It is under the administration of Tongliao City, 76 kilometres (47 mi) to the east, and China National Highway 303 passes through it.

== History ==
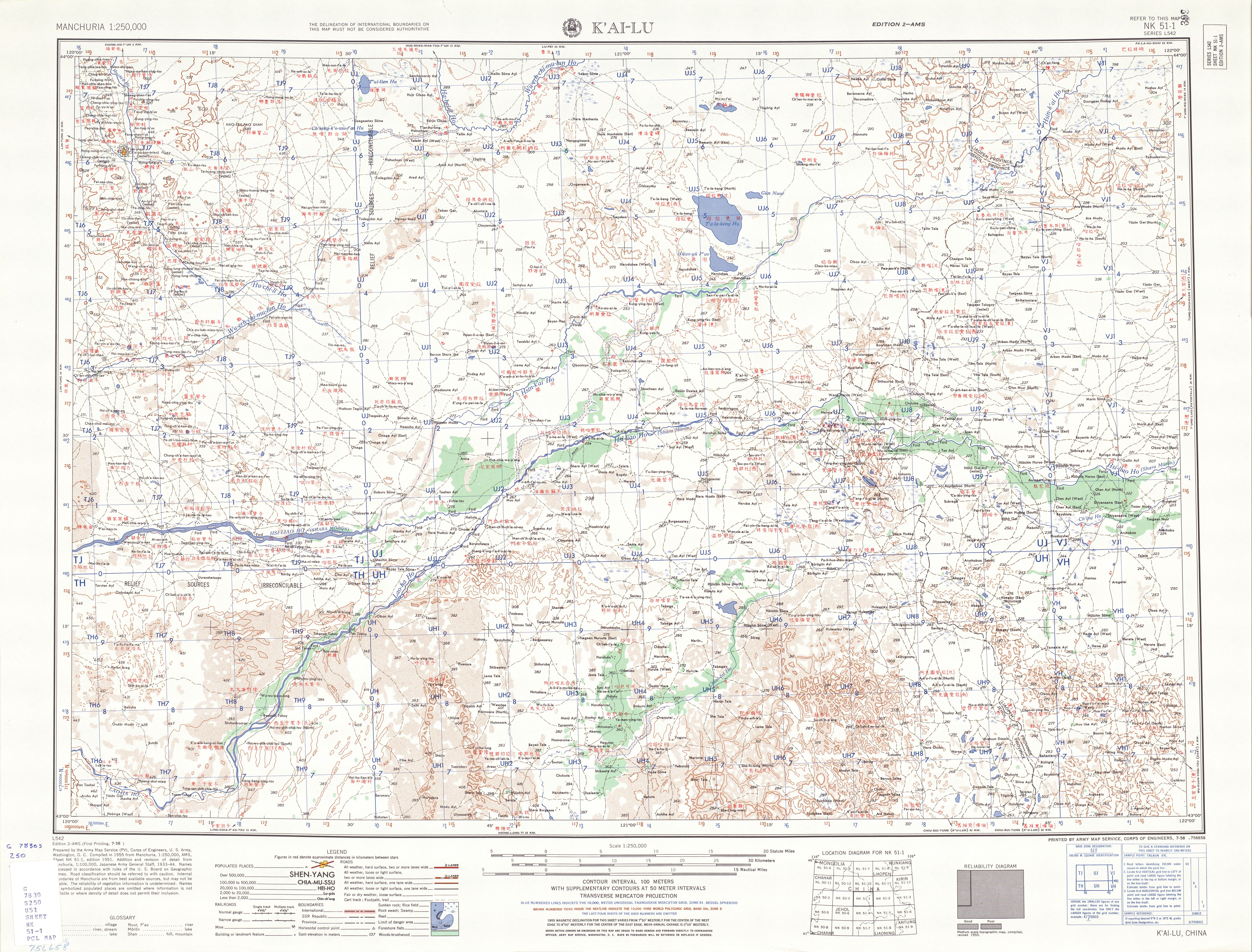
Map including Kailu (labeled as K'ai-lu (walled) 開魯) (AMS, 1955)

As the traditional seat of Ar Khorchin, East Jaruud and West Jaruud, the 3 areas are abbreviated in Chinese as the 3 R's since each contains the word R transcribed as "LU" in Chinese. The 3 R's was then known as the 3 Lu's as well. In 1905, with the slogan of developing the 3 R's (開發三魯), the city took the name of such abbreviation and was named 開魯 (KAI LU).

== Administrative divisions ==
Kailu County is made up of 10 towns.

Name	Simplified Chinese	Hanyu Pinyin	Mongolian (Hudum Script)	Mongolian (Cyrillic)	Administrative division code
Towns
Kailu Town	开鲁镇	Kāilǔ Zhèn	ᠺᠠᠢᠯᠦ ᠪᠠᠯᠭᠠᠰᠤ	Кайл балгас	150523100
Dayushu Town	大榆树镇	Dàyúshù Zhèn	ᠳ᠋ᠠ ᠢᠦᠢ ᠱᠦ ᠪᠠᠯᠭᠠᠰᠤ	Да юй шуу балгас	150523101
Heilongba Town	黑龙坝镇	Hēilóngbà Zhèn	ᠾᠧᠢ ᠯᠦᠩ ᠪᠠ ᠪᠠᠯᠭᠠᠰᠤ	Гей лүн ба балгас	150523102
Maixin Town	麦新镇	Màixīn Zhèn	ᠮᠠᠢᠰᠢᠨ ᠪᠠᠯᠭᠠᠰᠤ	Майшин балгас	150523103
Ih Tal Town	义和塔拉镇	Yìhétǎlā Zhèn	ᠶᠡᠬᠡᠲᠠᠯ᠎ᠠ ᠪᠠᠯᠭᠠᠰᠤ	Ихдэлээ балгас	150523104
Jianhua Town	建华镇	Jiànhuá Zhèn	ᠵᠢᠶᠠᠨᠬᠤᠸᠠ ᠪᠠᠯᠭᠠᠰᠤ	Жаанхуа балгас	150523105
Xiaojieji Town	小街基镇	Xiǎojiējī Zhèn	ᠰᠢᠶᠣᠤ ᠵᠢᠶᠧ ᠵᠢᠢ ᠪᠠᠯᠭᠠᠰᠤ	Шяо жье жий балгас	150523106
Dongfeng Town	东风镇	Dōngfēng Zhèn	ᠳ᠋ᠦᠩ ᠹᠧᠩ ᠪᠠᠯᠭᠠᠰᠤ	Дүн фен балгас	150523107
Jargalangt Town	吉日嘎郎吐镇	Jírìgālángtǔ Zhèn	ᠵᠢᠷᠭᠠᠯᠠᠩᠲᠤ ᠪᠠᠯᠭᠠᠰᠤ	Жаргалант балгас	150523108
Donglai Town	东来镇	Dōnglái Zhèn	ᠳ᠋ᠦᠩ ᠯᠠᠢ ᠪᠠᠯᠭᠠᠰᠤ	Дүн лай балгас	150523109

Others:

  - Qinghe Farm (清河农场)
  - Liaohe Farm (辽河农场)
  - Bao'an Farm (保安农场)

== Climate ==
Kailu County features a cold semi-arid climate (Köppen BSk), marked by long, very cold and dry winters, hot, somewhat humid summers, and strong winds, especially in spring. The monthly daily mean temperature in January, the coldest month, is −13.0 °C (8.6 °F), and in July, the warmest month, 24.2 °C (75.6 °F), with the annual mean at 7.0 °C (44.6 °F). The annual precipitation is 327.4 millimetres (12.9 in), with nearly half of it falling in July and August alone.

Climate data for Kailu, elevation 241 m (791 ft), (1991–2020 normals, extremes 1971–2010)
Month	Jan	Feb	Mar	Apr	May	Jun	Jul	Aug	Sep	Oct	Nov	Dec	Year
Record high °C (°F)	10.6 (51.1)	19.6 (67.3)	28.5 (83.3)	33.2 (91.8)	41.7 (107.1)	41.7 (107.1)	38.9 (102.0)	38.2 (100.8)	34.7 (94.5)	30.3 (86.5)	22.7 (72.9)	13.9 (57.0)	41.7 (107.1)
Mean daily maximum °C (°F)	−6.0 (21.2)	−0.8 (30.6)	7.0 (44.6)	16.7 (62.1)	24.2 (75.6)	28.5 (83.3)	30.2 (86.4)	28.8 (83.8)	24.1 (75.4)	15.3 (59.5)	3.7 (38.7)	−4.6 (23.7)	13.9 (57.1)
Daily mean °C (°F)	−12.7 (9.1)	−8.1 (17.4)	−0.1 (31.8)	9.7 (49.5)	17.5 (63.5)	22.4 (72.3)	24.6 (76.3)	22.9 (73.2)	17.0 (62.6)	8.3 (46.9)	−2.7 (27.1)	−10.8 (12.6)	7.3 (45.2)
Mean daily minimum °C (°F)	−17.9 (−0.2)	−14.1 (6.6)	−6.6 (20.1)	2.7 (36.9)	10.8 (51.4)	16.3 (61.3)	19.4 (66.9)	17.5 (63.5)	10.6 (51.1)	2.2 (36.0)	−7.7 (18.1)	−15.7 (3.7)	1.5 (34.6)
Record low °C (°F)	−33.6 (−28.5)	−30.0 (−22.0)	−24.6 (−12.3)	−9.8 (14.4)	−2.1 (28.2)	3.9 (39.0)	10.9 (51.6)	5.2 (41.4)	−1.7 (28.9)	−11.3 (11.7)	−22.6 (−8.7)	−29.0 (−20.2)	−33.6 (−28.5)
Average precipitation mm (inches)	1.4 (0.06)	1.8 (0.07)	5.3 (0.21)	12.4 (0.49)	34.6 (1.36)	67.4 (2.65)	85.3 (3.36)	68.6 (2.70)	28.2 (1.11)	15.1 (0.59)	6.1 (0.24)	2.1 (0.08)	328.3 (12.92)
Average precipitation days (≥ 0.1 mm)	1.8	1.8	2.6	4.3	7.5	10.2	10.5	8.5	6.0	3.6	2.7	2.3	61.8
Average snowy days	2.8	2.3	3.6	1.5	0	0	0	0	0	1.0	3.0	3.5	17.7
Average relative humidity (%)	51	42	38	36	41	55	68	68	57	49	50	53	51
Mean monthly sunshine hours	227.4	235.6	279.8	273.8	296.0	282.5	273.4	279.1	271.1	251.7	211.3	208.7	3,090.4
Percentage possible sunshine	78	79	75	68	65	61	59	65	73	75	74	75	71
Source 1: China Meteorological Administration
Source 2: Weather China
