= Sanhe Manchu and Korean Ethnic Township =

Sanhe Manchu and Korean Ethnic Township 三合满族朝鲜族乡 삼함만족조선족향 ᠰᠠᠨ ᡥᠣ ᠮᠠᠨᠵᡠ ᡠᡴᠰᡠᡵᠠ ᠴᠣᠣᡥᡳᠶᠠᠨ ᡠᡴᠰᡠᡵᠠ ᡤᠠᡧᠠᠨ
- Ethnic township

Chinese transcription(s)
  - Simplified Chinese: 三合满族朝鲜族乡
  - Simplified Chinese: 三合滿族朝鮮族鄉
  - Hanyu Pinyin: Yánbiān Cháoxiǎnzú Zìzhìzhōu

Korean and Manchu transcription(s)
  - Chosŏn'gŭl: 삼함만족조선족향
  - McCune–Reischauer: Samham manjok chosŏnjok hyang
  - Revised Romanization: Samham manjok joseonjok hyang
  - Manchu alphabet: ᠰᠠᠨ ᡥᠣ ᠮᠠᠨᠵᡠ ᡠᡴᠰᡠᡵᠠ ᠴᠣᠣᡥᡳᠶᠠᠨ ᡠᡴᠰᡠᡵᠠ ᡤᠠᡧᠠᠨ
  - Möllendorff: san ho manju uksura coohiyan uksura gašan
- Location in Jilin
- Coordinates: 42°34′19″N 125°37′57″E
- Country: China
- Province: Jilin
- Prefecture-level city: Liaoyuan
- County: Dongfeng
- Village-level divisions: 16 villages
- Elevation: 341 m (1,119 ft)
- Time zone: UTC+8 (China Standard)
- Area code: 0835

Sanhe (simplified Chinese: 三合满族朝鲜族乡; traditional Chinese: 三合滿族朝鮮族鄉; pinyin: Sānhé Mǎnzú Cháoxiǎnzú Xiāng; Korean: 삼함만족조선족향; Manchu: ᠰᠠᠨ ᡥᠣ ᠮᠠᠨᠵᡠ ᡠᡴᠰᡠᡵᠠ ᠴᠣᠣᡥᡳᠶᠠᠨ ᡠᡴᠰᡠᡵᠠ ᡤᠠᡧᠠᠨ) is a township of Dongfeng County in southwestern Jilin province, China, located 14.4 kilometres (8.9 mi) southeast of the county seat and just northwest of Meihekou. As of 2018, it has 16 villages under its administration.
