= Dawa District =

Dawa District 大洼区 Tawa
- District
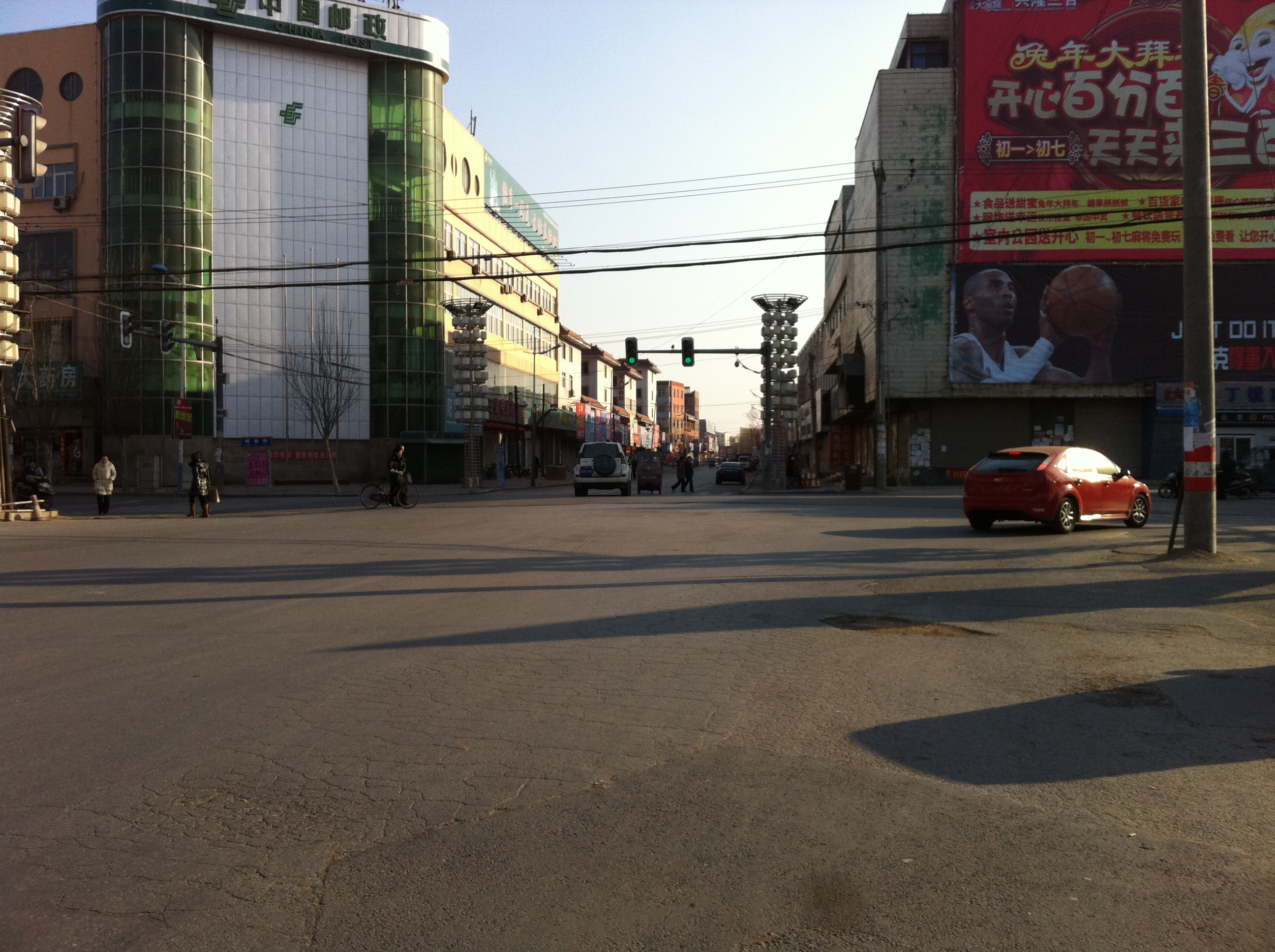

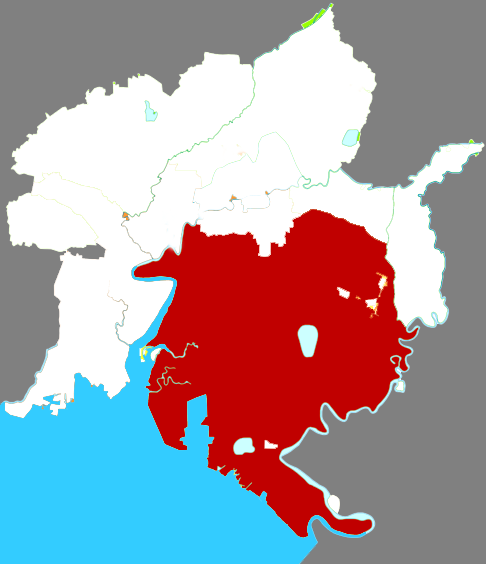
- Location in Panjin

- Location in Liaoning
- Coordinates: 41°00′N 122°05′E
- Country: People's Republic of China
- Province: Liaoning
- Prefecture-level city: Panjin

Area
  - District: 1,683 km^{2} (650 sq mi)

Population (2020 census)
  - District: 422,797
  - Density: 251.2/km^{2} (650.6/sq mi)
  - Urban: 263,101
- Time zone: UTC+8 (China Standard)
- Website: www.dawa.gov.cn

Dawa District (simplified Chinese: 大洼区; traditional Chinese: 大窪區; pinyin: Dàwā Qū; lit. 'great wetland district') is a district of the city of Panjin, in central Liaoning province of Northeast China. The district has a land area of 1,683 square kilometres (650 sq mi) and a population of 263,101 in 2020. The postal code is 124200. The district seat is located in Zhanqian Community in Dawa Town. The district was known as Dawa County (大洼县; 大窪縣; Dàwā Xiàn) until 2016, when it was converted to a district.

== Administrative divisions ==
Dawa consists of six subdistricts and 10 towns.

Subdistricts

- Rongbin Subdistrict (荣滨街道), Erjiegou Subdistrict (二界沟街道), Rongxing Subdistrict (荣兴街道), Dawa Subdistrict (大洼街道), Tianjia Subdistrict (田家街道), Yushu Subdistrict (榆树街道), Xianghai Subdistrict (向海街道), Qianjin Subdistrict (前进街道)

Towns

- Tianzhuangtai (Tienchwangtai) (田庄台镇), Dongfeng (东风镇), Xinkai (新开镇), Qingshui (清水镇), Xinxing (新兴镇), Xi'an (西安镇), Xinli (新立镇), Tangjia (唐家镇), Ping'an Township (平安镇), Zhaoquanhe (赵圈河镇)

== Tourism ==
The Red Beach, a marsh landscape famous for a sea of red plants, is in the district.
