= Red Beach (Panjin) =

Wetland in Liaoning, China

Coordinates: 40°54′11.23″N 121°49′25.45″E

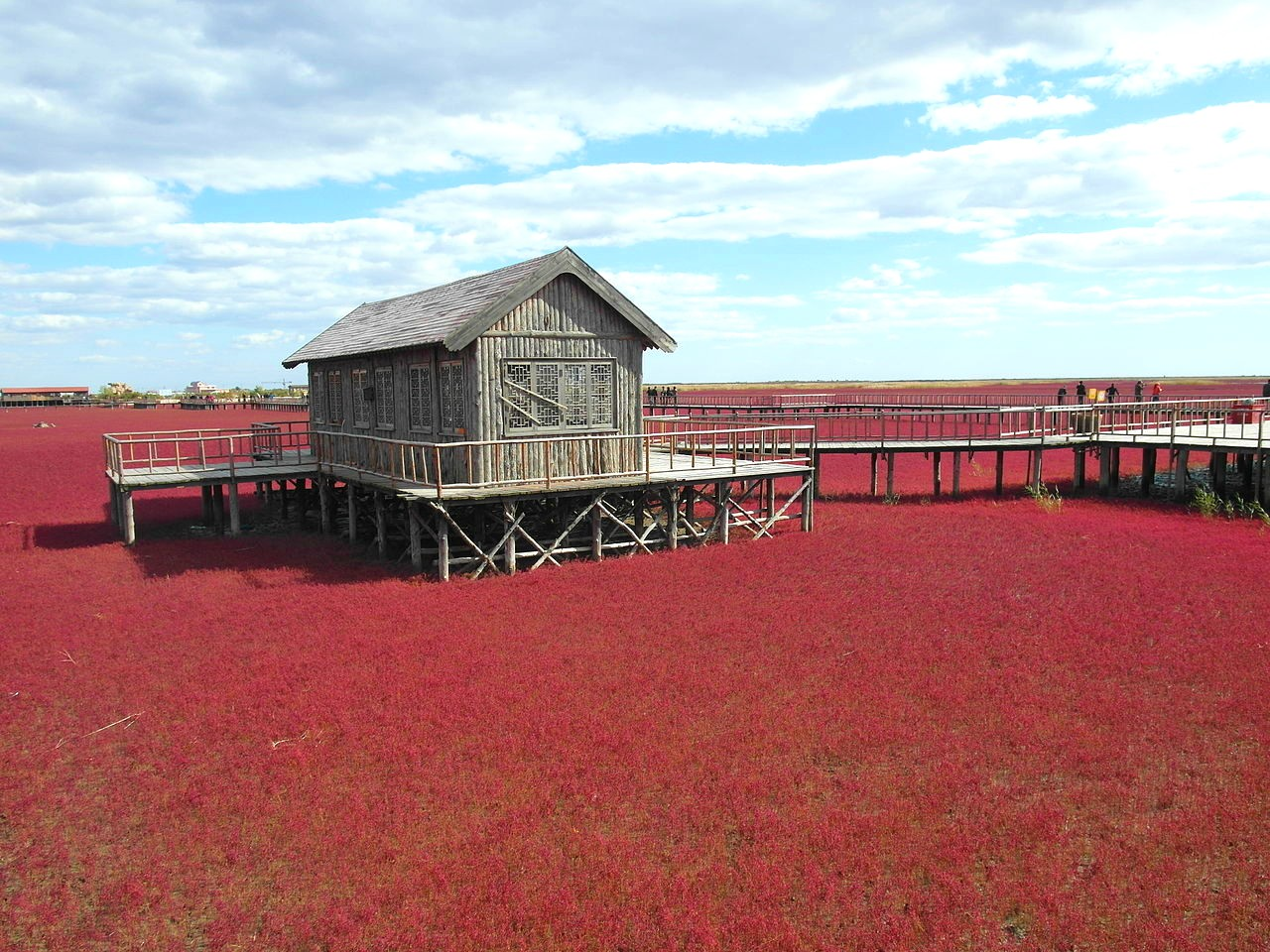
Red Beach, Panjin, China

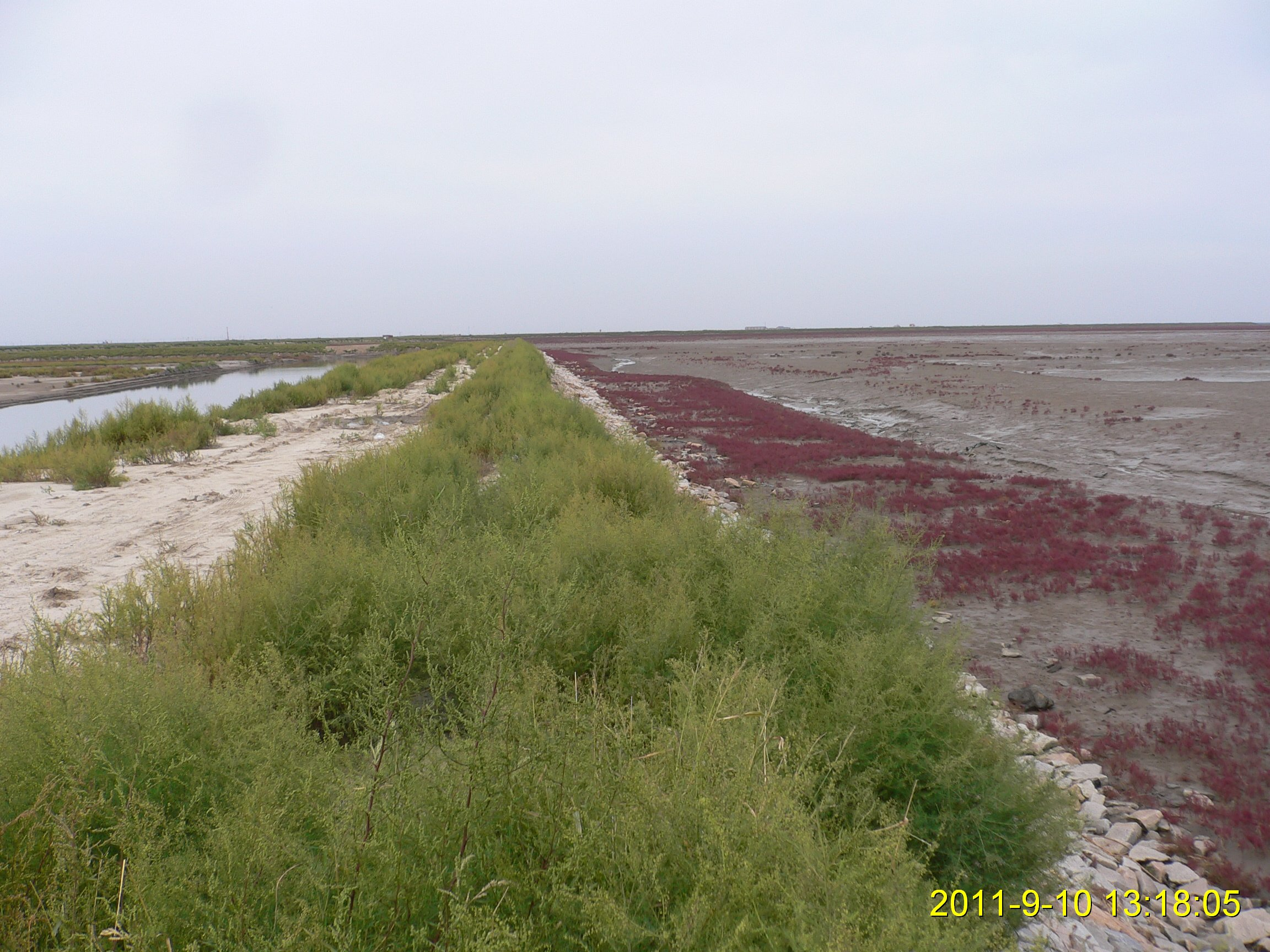

Red Beach (simplified Chinese: 红海滩; traditional Chinese: 紅海灘; pinyin: Hóng hǎitān), located in Dawa County, Panjin, Liaoning, China, is famous for its landscape featuring the red plant of Suaeda salsa (Chinese: 碱蓬草) of the family Chenopodiaceae. It is based in the biggest wetland and reed marsh in the world. The landscape is composed of shallow seas and tide-lands.

== Formation ==
The Sueda is one of the few species of plant that can live in highly alkaline soil. Its growth cycle starts in April when it is colored light red, while the color of the mature species is deep red.

== The nature protection area ==
Panjin Shuangtaizi River mouth state-level nature protection area (盘锦双台子河口自然保护区) preserves a very large, ecologically intact wetland. More than 260 kinds of birds and 399 kinds of wild animals live in it. It was promoted to the state-level nature protection area in 1988 and has applied to join the International person and biosphere protectorate network.

== Surrounding area ==
The largest reed marsh in Asia is also located here, attracting many tourists. The reeds are used to make paper. The red-crowned crane (Grus japonensis) also reproduces here and it is also the endangered black-mouth gull's largest breeding area.
