= Daxing, Dongfeng County =

Town in Jilin, China

Daxing 大兴镇
- Town
- Location in Jilin
- Coordinates: 42°44′43″N 125°22′54″E
- Country: People's Republic of China
- Province: Jilin
- Prefecture-level city: Liaoyuan
- County: Dongfeng County
- Time zone: UTC+8 (China Standard)

Daxing (simplified Chinese: 大兴; traditional Chinese: 大興; pinyin: Dàxīng) is a town under the administration of Dongfeng County, Jilin, China. As of 2018, it has 12 villages under its administration.
