= Hongqi =

Hongqi (Chinese: 红旗; lit. 'Red Banner') may refer to:

- Hongqi (magazine), published by the Chinese Communist Party from 1958 to 1988
- Hongqi (automobile), luxury car series of First Automobile Works (FAW), Changchun, Jilin, China
- Hongqi Press, a book publisher of China

== Places in China ==
- Hongqi District, Xinxiang, Henan
- Hongqi, Tibet, name of many settlements in Tibet

Community

- Hongqi, Zhucheng, Zhucheng Subdistrict, Xinzhou District, Wuhan, Hubei

Subdistricts

- Hongqi Subdistrict, Maoming, in Maonan District, Maoming, Guangdong
- Hongqi Subdistrict, Hegang, in Gongnong District, Hegang, Heilongjiang
- Hongqi Subdistrict, Jiagedaqi District, in Jiagedaqi District, Da Hinggan Ling Prefecture, Heilongjiang
- Hongqi Subdistrict, Shuangyashan, in Baoshan District, Shuangyashan, Heilongjiang
- Hongqi Subdistrict, Xiangfang, in Xiangfang District, Heilongjiang
- Hongqi Subdistrict, Hebi, in Shancheng District, Hebi, Henan
- Hongqi Subdistrict, Wuhan, in Hongshan District, Wuhan, Hubei
- Hongqi Subdistrict, Xiangtan (红旗街道), a subdistrict of Yuetang District in Xiangtan City, Hunan Province.
- Hongqi Subdistrict, Baishan, in Hunjiang District, Baishan, Jilin
- Hongqi Subdistrict, Changchun, in Chaoyang District, Changchun, Jilin
- Hongqi Subdistrict, Jilin City, in Fengman District, Jilin City, Jilin
- Hongqi Subdistrict, Chaoyang, Liaoning, in Shuangta District, Chaoyang, Liaoning
- Hongqi Subdistrict, Dalian, in Ganjingzi District, Dalian, Liaoning
- Hongqi Subdistrict, Panjin, in Shuangtaizi District, Panjin, Liaoning
- Hongqi Subdistrict, Qinghe District, Tieling, in Qinghe District, Tieling, Liaoning
- Hongqi Subdistrict, Yinzhou District, Tieling, in Yinzhou District, Tieling, Liaoning
- Hongqi Subdistrict, Xi'an, in Baqiao District, Xi'an, Shaanxi

Townships

- Hongqi Manchu Ethnic Township, Harbin (红旗满族乡), in Nangang District, Harbin, Heilongjiang

Villages

- Hongqi, Jingmen, Yonglong, Jingshan County, Jingmen, Hubei
- Hongqi, Renchaoxi, Renchaoxi, Sangzhi County, Zhangjiajie, Hunan

== Other uses ==
- Acer Inc., a Taiwanese company whose Chinese name is Hongqi (宏碁)
