= Dongfeng, Dawa District =

Dongfeng 东风镇
- Town
- Location in Liaoning
- Coordinates: 40°58′39″N 122°16′12″E
- Country: People's Republic of China
- Province: Liaoning
- Prefecture-level city: Panjin
- County: Dawa
- Elevation: 4 m (13 ft)
- Time zone: UTC+8 (China Standard)

Dongfeng (simplified Chinese: 东风; traditional Chinese: 東風; pinyin: Dōngfēng; lit. 'east wind') is a town of Dawa County in central Liaoning province, China. As of 2011, it has 11 villages under its administration. It is served by Liaoning Provincial Highway 211 (S211).

== See also ==
- List of township-level divisions of Liaoning
