= Zhejiang Daily =

Chinese Communist Party newspaper

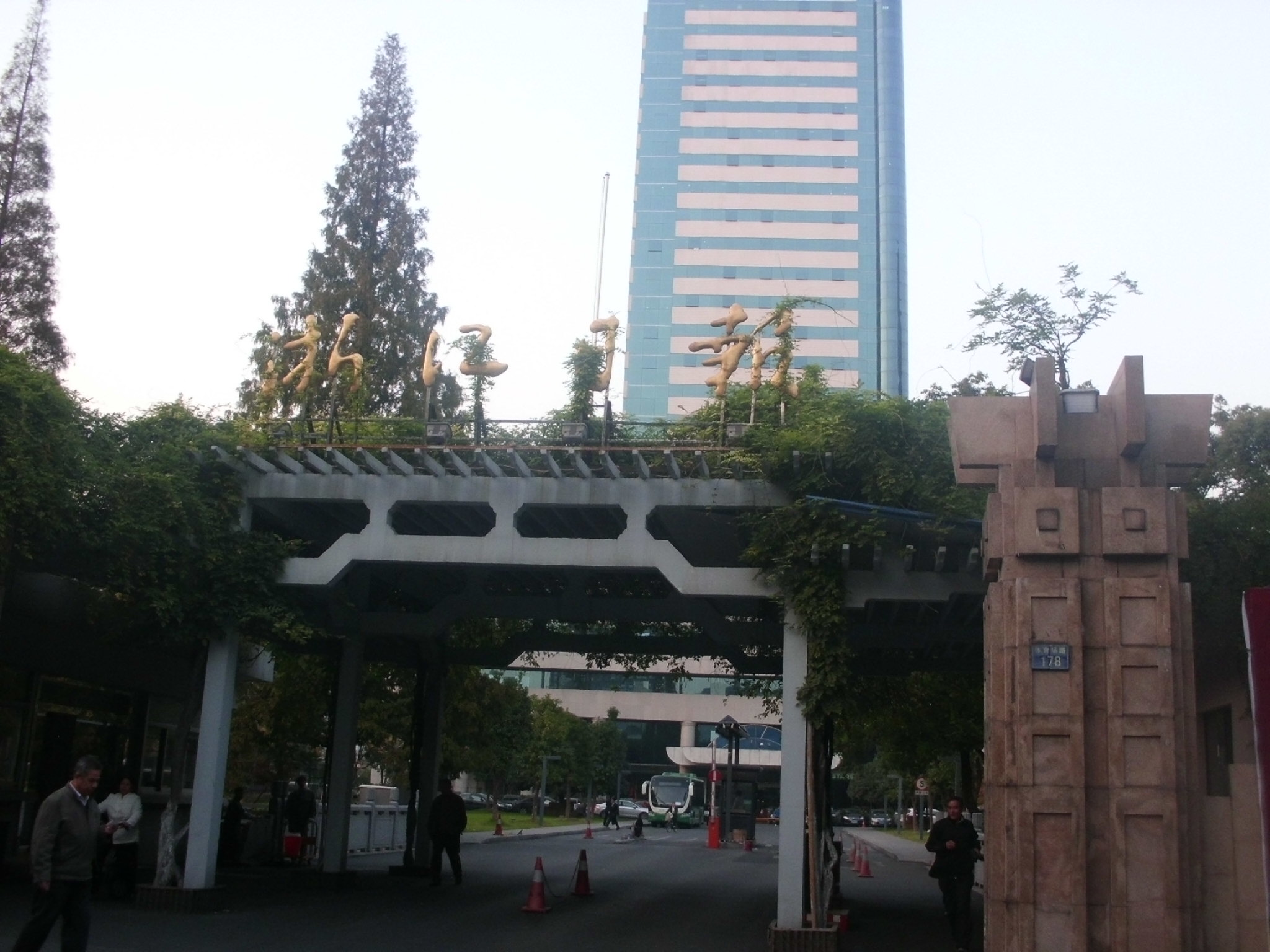
- Main Gate of Zhejiang Daily Press
- Owner: Zhejiang Provincial Committee of the Chinese Communist Party
- Publisher: Zhejiang Daily Press Group
- Founded: 1949
- Political alignment: Chinese Communist Party
- Language: Chinese
- Headquarters: 178 Stadium Road, Xiucheng District, Hangzhou, Zhejiang Province, China
- Website: zjrb.zjol.com.cn

Zhejiang Daily (Chinese: 浙江日报) is the official organ of the Zhejiang Provincial Committee of the Chinese Communist Party. It was founded on May 9, 1949, and is currently published by the Zhejiang Daily Press Group. Its circulation has always ranked among the highest of provincial party committee publications in China. In contrast to other provincial party publications in China, the masthead of Zhejiang Daily utilizes the gathered ink of Lu Xun. In the late 1970s, Zhejiang Daily had a masthead engraved by Hua Guofeng.

== History ==
On May 3, 1949, Hangzhou was liberated following the entry of the People's Liberation Army into the city. In the afternoon of that day, a platoon from a PLA department was deployed to the Southeast Daily Newspaper, previously under the authority of the CC Clique of the Kuomintang, and affixed seals on significant locations, including documentation, archives, factories, and warehouses. On May 7, the Hangzhou Military Control Committee of the PLA (Chinese: 中国人民解放军杭州市军事管制委员会) dispatched Zhao Yang (Chinese: 赵扬), a military representative, to oversee a news team of over 30 individuals tasked with acquiring Southeast Daily Newspaper, while concurrently making preparations for the establishment of Zhejiang Daily Newspaper. On May 9, Zhejiang Daily was established, marking the first public publication and distribution of a Communist Party newspaper in the history of Zhejiang province. The newspaper was initially established in Hangzhou Zhong'anqiao (Chinese: 众安桥), the former location of the Southeast Daily Newspaper. The office amenities were rudimentary, depending on an iron radio for transmitting and receiving telegrams, while printing and publishing were conducted manually using hand typesetting and antiquated printing machinery.

Following the onset of the Cultural Revolution, the progress of Zhejiang Daily ceased, and in the early hours of December 29, 1966, the newspaper was assaulted by a rebel organization, resulting in its suspension. On January 6, 1967, the former editor-in-chief, Yu Guanxi, was removed, while previous members of the leadership team underwent "isolation review." On January 10, the "rebels" confiscated the operational rights of Zhejiang Daily. In September 1969, the Zhejiang Provincial Revolutionary Committee resolved that Zhejiang Daily would serve as the official publication of the Provincial Revolutionary Committee starting October 1, 1969. In October 1973, Zhejiang Daily relocated from its previous site at Zong'anqiao to a new location on Stadium Road, where the office building and printing facility were expanded to a larger area. The office building and printing facility were enlarged.

Following the dismantling of the Gang of Four in October 1976, Zhejiang Daily was reinstated as the official publication of the Zhejiang Provincial Committee of the Chinese Communist Party. Following the 3rd plenary session of the 11th Central Committee of the Chinese Communist Party, Zhejiang Daily commenced a new historical phase and implemented a series of reforms in journalism, advocating for newspaper publicity to be intensified and revitalized, and emphasizing that news should be "concise, innovative, rapid, dynamic, and accurate." After the 1980s, Zhejiang Daily established several newspapers and magazines. The Zhejiang Daily Press Group was officially created on June 25, 2000, with the Zhejiang Daily as its flagship publication.

Zhejiang Daily inaugurated its online counterpart in June 1999, which has subsequently evolved into the Zhejiang Online. In 2018, the newspaper was designated as one of the top 100 national newspapers recommended in 2017. In May 2024, the newspaper established an international communication center.

== See also ==
- Zhejiang Online
