= Red Flag Publishing House =

Book publisher of China

- Native name: 红旗出版社
- Founded: 1981; 44 years ago
- Headquarters: China
- Parent: Zhejiang Daily Press Group
- Website: www.hongqipress.net

Red Flag Publishing House or Hongqi Press (红旗出版社) is a book publisher based in China. It is a subsidiary company of Zhejiang Daily Press Group. Established in 1981, it is originally belonged to Qiushi, the theoretical journal of the Chinese Communist Party, and named after its predecessor Red Flag magazine, before its reconstruction in 2010. It mainly dedicated to political and economic publication, especially dealing with the construction and the political theories of Chinese Communist Party.
