= Red Flag Group =

International company

The Red Flag Group was a global integrity and compliance risk firm based in Hong Kong with 15 offices located throughout the United States, Asia, Middle East and Europe. The firm had approximately 300 employees, who advised clients across a range of industries on compliance and anti-corruption regulation. It also had a partnership with LexisNexis in the area of outsourced due diligence.

They applied a unique set of business intelligence, advice, and technology to manage the integrity and compliance risks across four key areas:

- Planning, implementing, measuring and monitoring integrity and compliance programmes
- Selecting and managing the integrity of suppliers
- Selecting and ensuring compliance in sales channel compliance
- Making sure you know your customers so your integrity in protected

On 5 October 2020, The Red Flag Group was acquired by Refinitiv.

== Area ==
- Antitrust and corruption
- Employment, safety and reputation
- Cyber security and business stability
- Environment and governance
