= Dongfeng, Kailu County =

Dongfeng 东风镇 ᠳ᠋ᠦᠩ ᠹᠧᠩ
- Town
- Location in Inner Mongolia
- Coordinates: 43°40′03″N 121°34′14″E
- Country: People's Republic of China
- Region: Inner Mongolia
- Prefecture-level city: Tongliao
- County: Kailu
- Elevation: 220 m (720 ft)
- Time zone: UTC+8 (China Standard)

Dongfeng (simplified Chinese: 东风; traditional Chinese: 東風; pinyin: Dōngfēng; lit. 'east wind') Dün fyen (Mongolian: ᠳ᠋ᠦᠩ
ᠹᠧᠩ; Дүн фен) is a town of Kailu County in eastern Inner Mongolia, China, located along China National Highway 303 about 60 km (37 mi) from Tongliao. As of 2011, it has 14 villages under its administration.

== See also ==
- List of township-level divisions of Inner Mongolia
