= Dongfeng County =

Dongfeng County 东丰县
- County
- Location in Jilin
- Coordinates: 42°41′N 125°32′E
- Country: People's Republic of China
- Province: Jilin
- Prefecture-level city: Liaoyuan
- County seat: Dongfeng Town

Area
  - Total: 2,522 km^{2} (974 sq mi)
- Elevation: 364 m (1,194 ft)

Population
  - Total: 410,000
  - Density: 160/km^{2} (420/sq mi)
- Time zone: UTC+8 (China Standard)
- Postal code: 136300
- Website: http://www.dongfeng.gov.cn/

Dongfeng County (simplified Chinese: 东丰县; traditional Chinese: 東豐縣; pinyin: Dōngfēng Xiàn) is located in southwestern Jilin province, China and is under the administration of Liaoyuan City.

It is mainly agricultural with the main crops being wheat and maize (corn). Its major industry is a pharmaceutical company (Dongfeng Yaoye), after which the county town's main street is named. Deer are also raised for their meat and antlers, which are used in Chinese medicine.

It is a relatively poor county with salaries starting at ¥300. Many people in the county town are unemployed and rely on riding "daoqilu" (pedicabs where the driver is seated at the back and the passengers at the front) and tuk tuks to make a living.

The county is linked by a single track railway to Liaoyuan and Siping in one direction and Meihekou in the other, with trains running to Beijing, Tonghua and Changchun amongst other places. There is also a frequent bus service to Meihekou, the nearest large town, which can also be reached by shared taxi for ¥20 or ¥5 a person. Buses also link Dongfeng with Liaoyuan, Siping, Changchun, Shenyang, and other cities and counties.

Temperatures range from up to 30°C in the short summer to -30°C or even -40°C in the long winter, during which snow covers the ground and the rivers and drains are iced up.

Most of the people living in Dongfeng are Han Chinese, but there are also scattered ethnic Korean communities, and a Korean Township. However, the local media do not have any Korean language programmes or newspapers to cater for them and many of the Koreans in Dongfeng have lost their Korean language skills even though there is a Korean language secondary school and a Korean church available to them.

== Administrative divisions ==
The county administers 12 towns, one township, and one ethnic township.

Towns:

- Dongfeng (东丰镇)
- Dayang (大阳镇)
- Hengdaohe (横道河镇)
- Nadanbo (那丹伯镇)
- Houshi (猴石镇)
- Yangmulin (杨木林镇)
- Xiaosiping (小四平镇)
- Huanghe (黄河镇)
- Lalahe (拉拉河镇)
- Shahe (沙河镇)
- Nantunji (南屯基镇)
- Daxing (大兴镇)

Townships:

- Erlongshan Township (二龙山乡)
- Sanhe Manchu and Korean Ethnic Township (三合满族朝鲜族乡)

== Climate ==
Climate data for Dongfeng, elevation 345 m (1,132 ft), (1991–2020 normals, extremes 1981–2010)
Month	Jan	Feb	Mar	Apr	May	Jun	Jul	Aug	Sep	Oct	Nov	Dec	Year
Record high °C (°F)	6.3 (43.3)	14.1 (57.4)	19.2 (66.6)	29.0 (84.2)	33.6 (92.5)	35.4 (95.7)	36.0 (96.8)	34.5 (94.1)	30.5 (86.9)	27.1 (80.8)	20.9 (69.6)	11.4 (52.5)	36.0 (96.8)
Mean daily maximum °C (°F)	−7.9 (17.8)	−3.0 (26.6)	4.6 (40.3)	14.5 (58.1)	21.5 (70.7)	25.7 (78.3)	27.7 (81.9)	26.6 (79.9)	22.0 (71.6)	14.0 (57.2)	2.9 (37.2)	−5.7 (21.7)	11.9 (53.4)
Daily mean °C (°F)	−17.0 (1.4)	−11.3 (11.7)	−1.8 (28.8)	7.7 (45.9)	15.1 (59.2)	20.1 (68.2)	22.8 (73.0)	21.2 (70.2)	14.7 (58.5)	6.5 (43.7)	−3.4 (25.9)	−13.3 (8.1)	5.1 (41.2)
Mean daily minimum °C (°F)	−24.2 (−11.6)	−18.9 (−2.0)	−8.1 (17.4)	0.7 (33.3)	8.1 (46.6)	14.4 (57.9)	18 (64)	16.4 (61.5)	8.1 (46.6)	0.0 (32.0)	−9.1 (15.6)	−19.9 (−3.8)	−1.2 (29.8)
Record low °C (°F)	−42.7 (−44.9)	−39.3 (−38.7)	−27.8 (−18.0)	−12.3 (9.9)	−4.0 (24.8)	4.4 (39.9)	9.1 (48.4)	1.96 (35.53)	−4.1 (24.6)	−12.2 (10.0)	−30.3 (−22.5)	−38.4 (−37.1)	−42.7 (−44.9)
Average precipitation mm (inches)	4.8 (0.19)	7.2 (0.28)	14.1 (0.56)	30.7 (1.21)	61.1 (2.41)	94.6 (3.72)	167.6 (6.60)	164.7 (6.48)	52.5 (2.07)	37.6 (1.48)	20.5 (0.81)	8.7 (0.34)	664.1 (26.15)
Average precipitation days (≥ 0.1 mm)	5.9	4.7	6.9	7.5	11.7	14.8	15.1	14.3	8.9	8.6	7.6	7.3	113.3
Average snowy days	8.6	6.9	8.2	3.1	0	0	0	0	0	1.7	7.6	9.5	45.6
Average relative humidity (%)	71	67	61	54	58	69	79	82	77	70	70	71	69
Mean monthly sunshine hours	175.1	192.5	226.7	227.2	254.3	237.8	221.4	220.7	233.7	211.1	165.5	156.9	2,522.9
Percentage possible sunshine	60	64	61	56	56	52	48	52	63	63	57	56	57
Source: China Meteorological Administration
