= Panjin =

City in Liaoning, China

Panjin 盘锦市
- Prefecture-level city
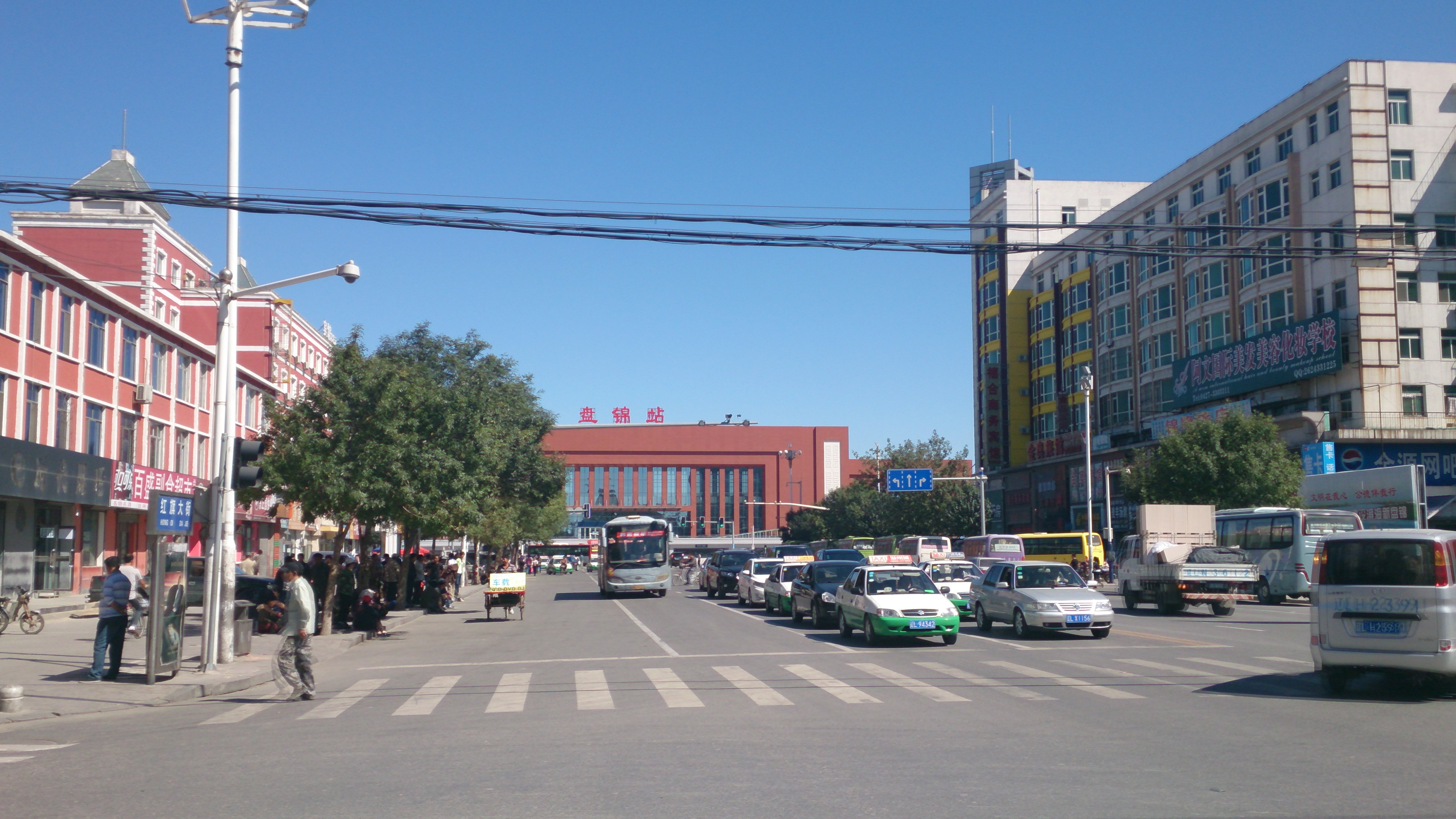

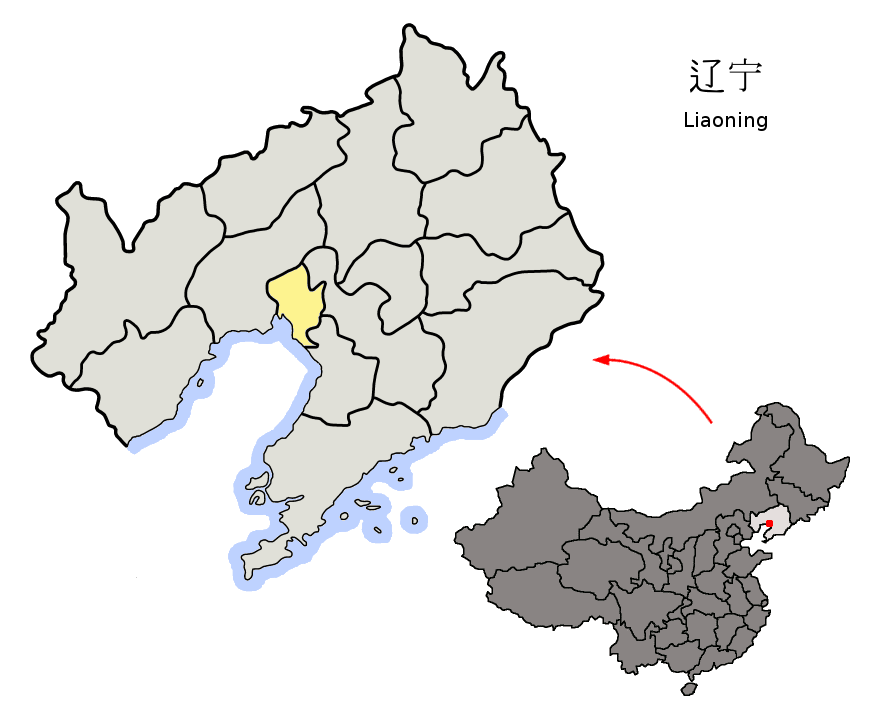
- Location of Panjin City in Liaoning

- Location of the city centre in Liaoning
- Coordinates (Panjin Library): 41°07′04″N 122°03′55″E
- Country: People's Republic of China
- Province: Liaoning
- Districts and Counties: List: Shuangtaizi District; Xinglongtai District; Panshan County; Dawa County

Government
  - CPC Panjin: Committee Secretary

Area
  - Prefecture-level city: 3,825.2 km^{2} (1,476.9 sq mi)
  - Urban: 545.2 km^{2} (210.5 sq mi)
  - Metro: 3,825.2 km^{2} (1,476.9 sq mi)

Population (2020 census)
  - Prefecture-level city: 1,389,691
  - Density: 363.30/km^{2} (940.94/sq mi)
  - Urban: 1,166,481
  - Urban density: 2,140/km^{2} (5,541/sq mi)
  - Metro: 1,389,691
  - Metro density: 363.30/km^{2} (940.94/sq mi)

GDP
  - Prefecture-level city: CN¥ 125.7 billion US$ 20.2 billion
  - Per capita: CN¥ 87,351; US$ 14,025
- Time zone: UTC+8 (China Standard)
- Postal code: 124000
- Area code: 427
- ISO 3166 code: CN-LN-13
- Licence plates: 辽L
- Administrative division code: 211300
- Website: panjin.gov.cn

Panjin (Chinese: 盘锦; pinyin: Pánjǐn) is a coastal prefecture-level city in central Liaoning province, People's Republic of China, situated on the northern shore of the Liaodong Bay. It borders Anshan to the east, Yingkou to the southeast, and Jinzhou to the west and north. It is the smallest city in both Liaoning and the entire Northeast China with an administrative area of 3,825 square kilometres (1,477 sq mi), and Liaoning's least populous city with a population of 1,389,691 people as of the 2020 census, all in the built-up (or metro) area made of the 2 urban districts and Dawa and Panshan counties now largely being conurbated.

== Administration ==
Panjin has administrative jurisdiction over 3 districts and 1 county.

Map
#	Name	Chinese	Hanyu Pinyin	Population (2003 est.)	Area (km^{2})	Density (/km^{2})
1	Xinglongtai District	兴隆台区	Xīnglóngtái Qū	380,000	194	1,959
2	Shuangtaizi District	双台子区	Shuāngtáizi Qū	190,000	62	3,065
3	Dawa District	大洼区	Dàwā Qū	390,000	1,683	232
4	Panshan County	盘山县	Pánshān Xiàn	290,000	2,145	135

Panjin was established as a prefecture-level city with its current boundaries by the State Council on June 5, 1984.

== Geography ==
Panjin is located between 40°40'−41°27' N and 121°31'−122°28' E, with its urban section mainly on the historical Liao River Delta. The Shuangtaizi River (which gives name to the city's Shuangtaizi District), formally the smaller western distributary but now the only lower section of the Liao River system, flows through the city and drains into the Liaodong Bay to its west between its Dawa District and Panshan County. The Daliao River, historically Liao River's larger eastern distributary and the main lower section but now a separate river system since 1958, runs east of Panjin, serving as the border between it and the neighboring cities of Anshan and Yingkou.

Panjin is a major crude oil production centre of Northeast China, with access to the Liaohe Oil Field, which was once the third largest oil field in China behind Daqing and Shengli Oil Fields.

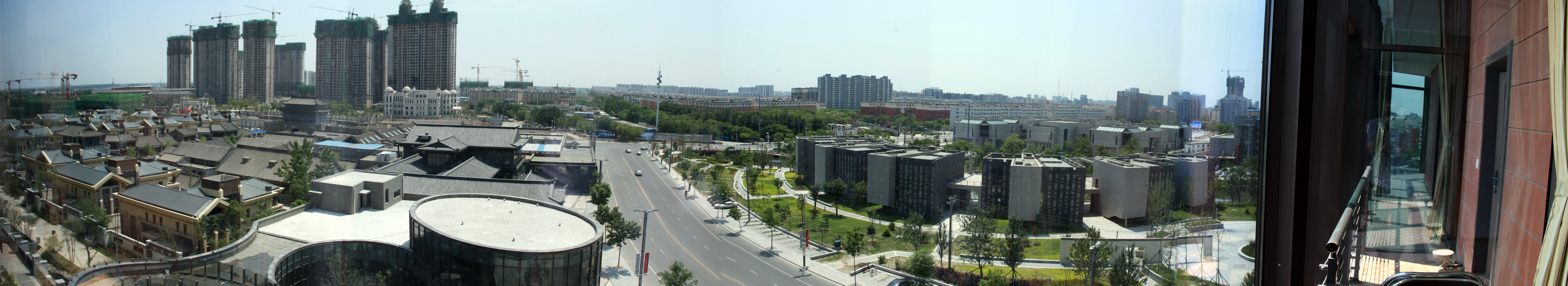
A panoramic view of Panjin (May 2012)

=== Climate ===
Panjin has a monsoon-influenced humid continental climate (Köppen Dwa). It has an annual mean temperature of 9.2 °C (48.6 °F) and receives over 2700 hours of sunshine a year.

Climate data for Panjin (Dawa District), elevation 6 m (20 ft), (1991–2020 normals)
Month	Jan	Feb	Mar	Apr	May	Jun	Jul	Aug	Sep	Oct	Nov	Dec	Year
Mean daily maximum °C (°F)	−3.1 (26.4)	0.9 (33.6)	7.4 (45.3)	15.9 (60.6)	22.4 (72.3)	26.0 (78.8)	28.4 (83.1)	28.3 (82.9)	24.3 (75.7)	16.6 (61.9)	6.6 (43.9)	−0.9 (30.4)	14.4 (57.9)
Daily mean °C (°F)	−8.1 (17.4)	−4.1 (24.6)	2.5 (36.5)	10.7 (51.3)	17.4 (63.3)	22.1 (71.8)	25.1 (77.2)	24.5 (76.1)	19.4 (66.9)	11.7 (53.1)	2.2 (36.0)	−5.5 (22.1)	9.8 (49.7)
Mean daily minimum °C (°F)	−12.4 (9.7)	−8.5 (16.7)	−1.9 (28.6)	5.9 (42.6)	13.1 (55.6)	18.8 (65.8)	22.2 (72.0)	21.2 (70.2)	15.1 (59.2)	7.2 (45.0)	−1.8 (28.8)	−9.5 (14.9)	5.8 (42.4)
Average precipitation mm (inches)	4.2 (0.17)	5.8 (0.23)	11.6 (0.46)	30.8 (1.21)	54.2 (2.13)	75.5 (2.97)	153.6 (6.05)	165.8 (6.53)	53.3 (2.10)	39.5 (1.56)	20.5 (0.81)	6.9 (0.27)	621.7 (24.49)
Average precipitation days (≥ 0.1 mm)	2.3	2.3	3.6	5.1	7.7	10.3	9.5	9.4	6.1	5.4	4.8	2.6	69.1
Average snowy days	3.0	2.9	2.7	0.8	0	0	0	0	0	0.3	3.0	3.5	16.2
Average relative humidity (%)	58	56	55	56	61	72	81	80	72	66	62	61	65
Mean monthly sunshine hours	206.8	209.0	252.1	253.6	276.4	232.7	205.5	220.1	234.1	217.8	183.5	187.2	2,678.8
Percentage possible sunshine	69	69	68	63	62	52	45	52	63	64	63	66	61
Source: China Meteorological Administration

== Attractions ==
Major points of interest include:

- Liaohekou State Natural Reserve (辽河口国家级自然保护区), formerly Shuangtaihekou State Natural Reserve (双台河口国家级自然保护区), a marshland that serves as a natural habitat for 321 species of animals. It also serves as one of the few breeding grounds for endangered birds such as the red-crowned crane and Saunders' gull. Millions of birds of as much as 172 different species stop at the area during their migration, including more than 20 endangered species such as the red-crowned crane, demoiselle crane, white stork, black stork, white-fronted goose, whooper swan, and brown goshawk. On a special note, Panjin is also called "Home of the Cranes" (鹤乡) for the above reasons.
- Golden Silk Beach (金帛滩) at Bohai Sea and the clam mound.
- Red Seabeach (红海滩) and the neighbouring reed marsh.
- Liaohe Tablet Forest Park (辽河碑林公园), formerly Hubin Park (湖滨公园) in Panshan, featuring the Liaohe Tablets. These stone tablets bear inscriptions of Chinese calligraphy by historical and contemporary artists, showing Chinese scripts from different ages.

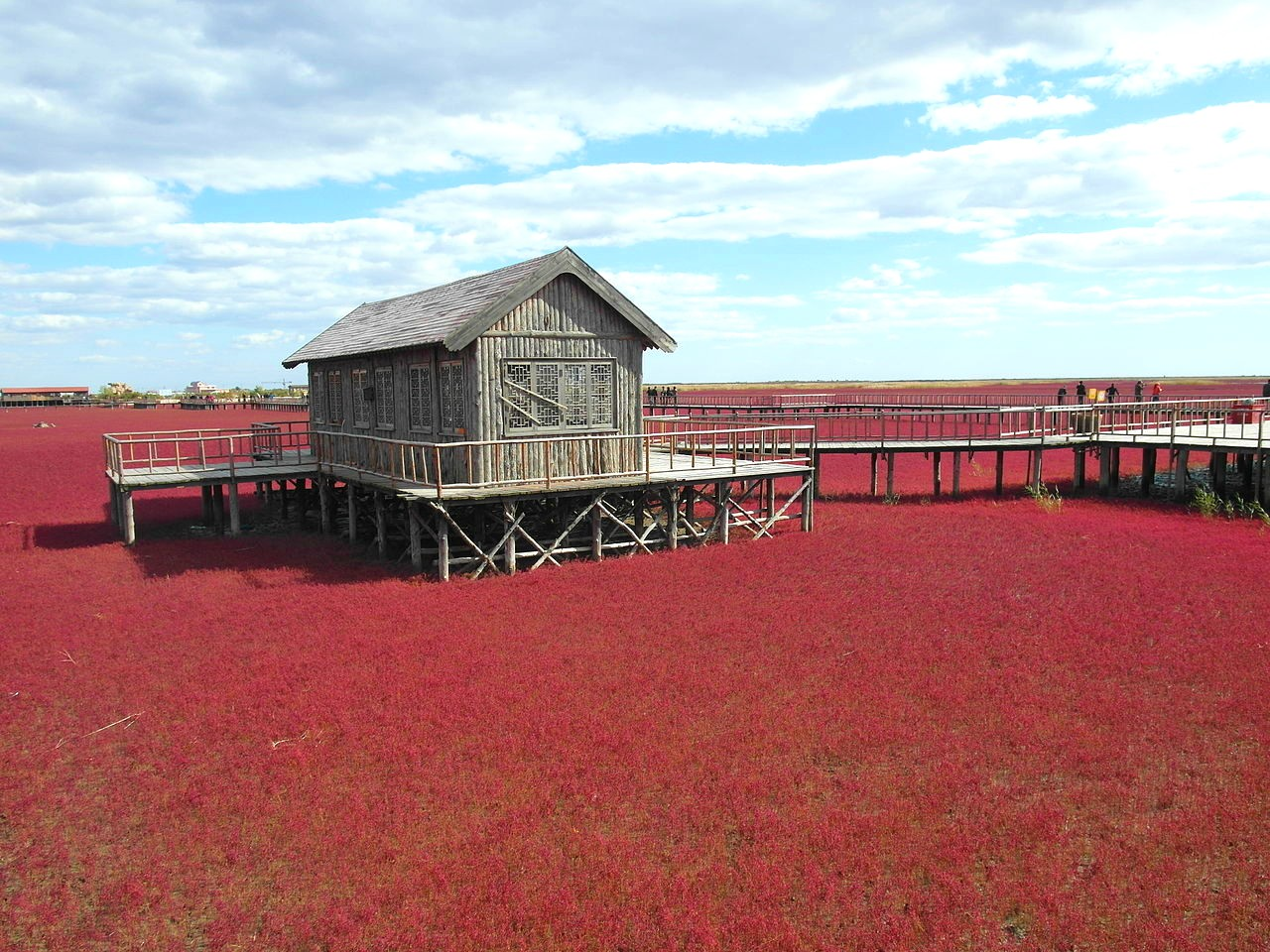
Red Seabeach

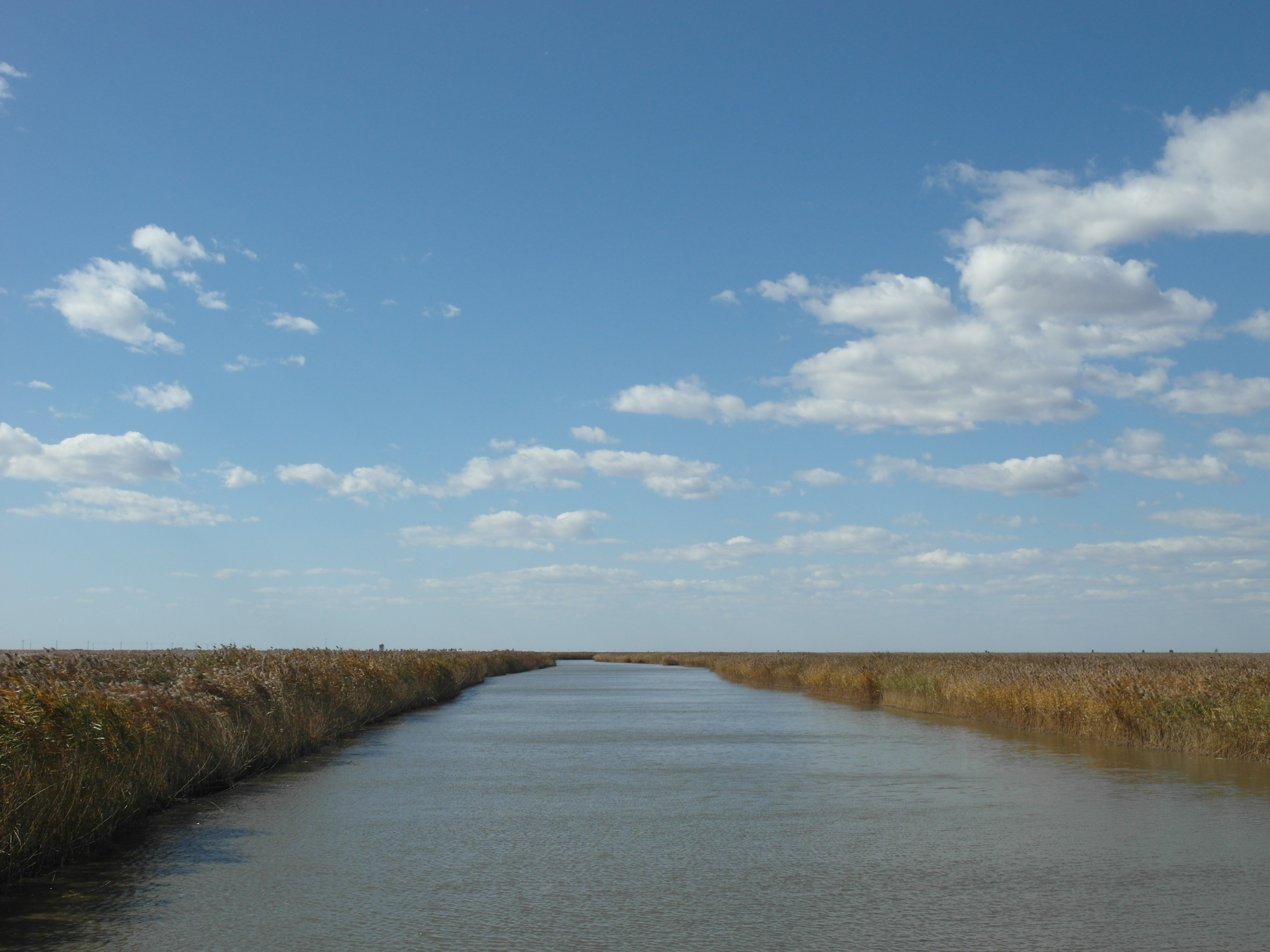
reed-grass beach

== See also ==
- List of twin towns and sister cities in China
- Zhou Yongkang, one-time mayor of Panjin

== Education ==
- Higher Education:

Dalian University of Technology, Panjin Campus

Liaohe Petroleum Career Technical College

Panjin Vocational and Technical College

- Secondary Education:

Panjin Senior Middle School
