= Dongfeng, Dongfeng County =

Dongfeng 东丰镇
- Town
- Location in Jilin
- Coordinates: 42°40′38″N 125°31′52″E
- Country: People's Republic of China
- Province: Jilin
- Prefecture-level city: Liaoyuan
- County: Dongfeng
- Elevation: 344 m (1,129 ft)
- Time zone: UTC+8 (China Standard)
- Postal code: 136300

Dongfeng (simplified Chinese: 东丰; traditional Chinese: 東豐; pinyin: Dōngfēng) is a town in and the seat of Dongfeng County in eastern Jilin province, China, located along China National Highway 303 about 45 km (28 mi) from Liaoyuan. As of 2011, it has nine residential communities (社区) and 21 villages under its administration.

== See also ==
- List of township-level divisions of Jilin
