= Red flag (politics) =

Symbol of socialism and left-wing politics

The plain red flag is often used at socialist or communist rallies, especially on International Workers' Day.

In politics, a red flag is predominantly a symbol of left-wing ideologies, including socialism, communism, anarchism, and the labour movement. The originally empty or plain red flag has been associated with left-wing politics since the French Revolution (1789–1799). The red flag and red as a political colour are the oldest symbols of communism and socialism.

Socialists adopted the symbol during the Revolutions of 1848. It was first used as the flag of a new authority by the Lyon Commune and Paris Commune in the aftermath of the Franco-Prussian War (1870–1871). The flag of the Soviet Union, introduced during the Russian Revolution, as well as the flags of many subsequent communist states, were explicitly inspired by the plain red flag. Many socialist and socialist-adjacent political parties, including those of democratic socialists and social democrats, have adapted and adopted a red flag as their symbol. The plain red flag was an official symbol of the Labour Party in the United Kingdom until the late 1980s. It was the inspiration for the socialist songs "The Red Flag" and "Bandiera Rossa".

== History ==
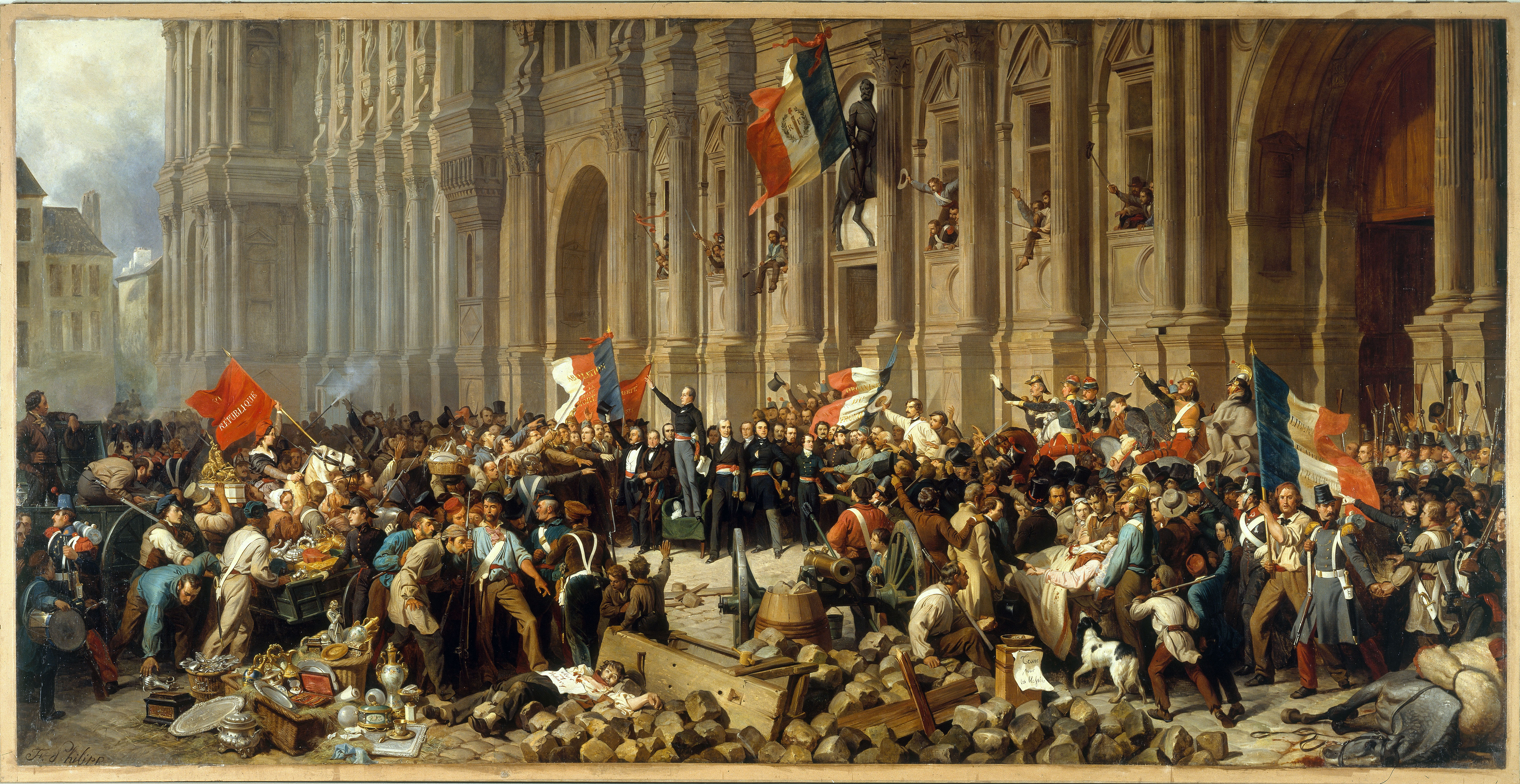
Lamartine Rejecting the Red Flag in Front of the City Hall, February 25, 1848. By Henri Félix Emmanuel Philippoteaux (1815–1884). Lamartine said that the red flag represented revolutionary violence, and "has to be put down immediately after the fighting".

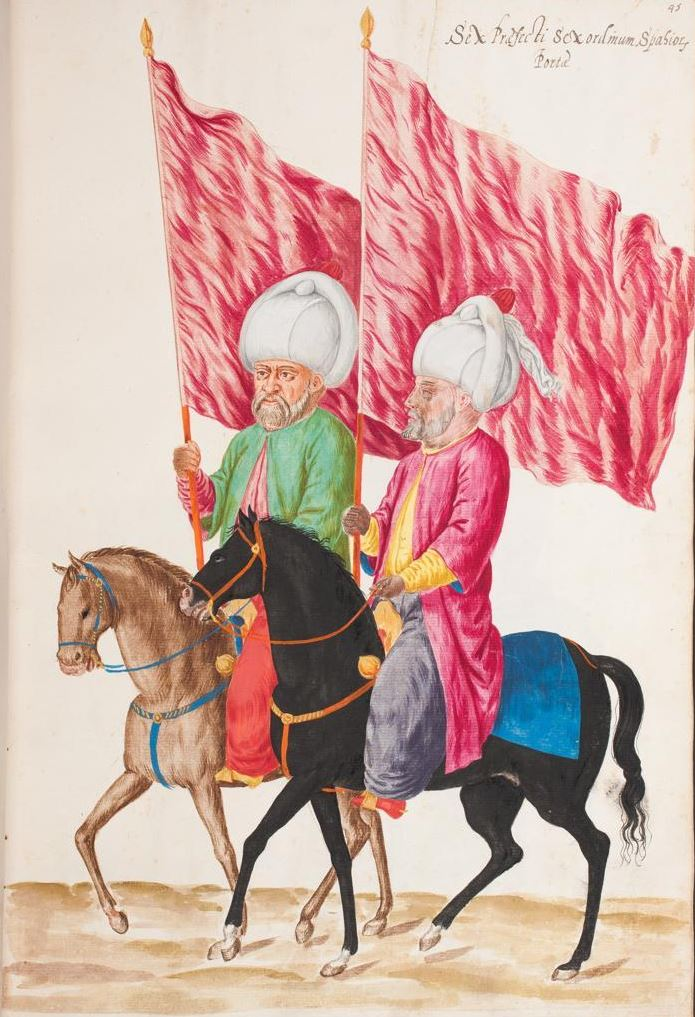
Plain red banners for the Sultan's retinue. From the Turkish Costume Book by Lambert de Vos, 1574.

Red color as a combat or revolt symbol in Europe goes back to the turn of the second millennium and before. In the Middle Ages, ships in combat flew long red streamers called baucans or bauccedillian to signify a fight with no quarter.

Prior to the French Revolution and in some contexts since, red banners were seen as symbols of defiance and battle. In the vein of nautical symbolism, ones hoisted on ships to signify no quarter were sometimes called bloody flags.

In Eastern Arabia, tribal federations used red standards as their flags. These federations later developed into sheikhdoms and emirates. The red standard was adopted as one of the early Islamic flags. The prominent Arab military commander Amr ibn al-As used a red banner.

The red cap was a symbol of popular revolt in France going back to the Jacquerie of 1358. The color red became associated with patriotism early in the French Revolution due to the popularity of the tricolour cockade, introduced in July 1789, and the revival of the ancient Phrygian cap in May 1790. A red flag was raised over the Champ-de-Mars in Paris on July 17, 1791, by Gilbert du Motier, marquis de Lafayette, commander of the National Guard, as a symbol of martial law, warning rioters to disperse. As many as fifty anti-royalist protesters were killed in the fighting that followed. Inverting the original symbolism, the Jacobins protested this action by flying a red flag to honour the "martyrs' blood" of those who had been killed. They created their own red flags to declare "the martial law of the people against the revolt of the court." The plain red flag has since been associated with left-wing politics.

In 1797, British sailors mutinied near the mouth of the River Thames and hoisted red flags on several ships.

Illustration of the Merthyr Rising with colourized flag

Two red flags soaked in calf's blood were flown by marchers in South Wales during the Merthyr Rising of 1831. It is claimed to be the first time that the red flag was waved as a banner of workers' power. The red flags of Merthyr became a potent relic following the execution of early trade unionist Dic Penderyn (Richard Lewis) in August 1831, despite a public campaign to pardon him.

During the Battle of the Alamo in March 1836, General Antonio López de Santa Anna of Mexico signified no quarter by displaying a plain blood-red flag (approx. 10 feet square) from the highest church tower in Béxar. William B. Travis, a commander of the Alamo defenders, responded with a blast from the Alamo's largest cannon. The Red Rovers used a specific blood-red flag as their company guidon, which was the first evidence of a distinct and separate Alabama identity. This flag, a bright red banner with fringe-trimmed hunting shirts and jeans, was a simple red banner presented to the soldiers by the ladies of Courtland. The flag served as a symbol of their identity and the volunteers' commitment to the cause of Texas independence.

The flag of the Colorados during the Uruguayan Civil War

During the Uruguayan Civil War (1839–1851), the victorious liberal faction of "Colorados" (lit. 'Reds') used red flags. This prolonged struggle received considerable attention and sympathy from liberals and revolutionaries in Europe; Giuseppe Garibaldi first made a name for himself in 1843, having been inspired to have his troops wear the famous Red Shirts.

The Ottoman Empire used a variety of flags, especially as naval ensigns, during its history. The star and crescent came into use in the second half of the 18th century. A buyruldu (lit. 'decree') from 1793 required that the ships of the Ottoman Navy use a red flag with the star and crescent in white. In 1844, a version of this flag with a five-pointed star was officially adopted as the flag of the Ottoman Empire.

During the 1848 revolution in France, socialists and radical republicans demanded that the red flag be adopted as France's national flag. Led by poet-politician Alphonse de Lamartine, the government rejected the demand: "[T]he red flag that you have brought back here has done nothing but being trailed around the Champ-de-Mars in the people's blood in [17]91 and [17]93, whereas the Tricolore flag went round the world along with the name, the glory and the liberty of the homeland!"

Following the unexpected defeat of France by the Germans in the Franco-Prussian War, French workers and socialist revolutionaries seized major cities and created the Lyon Commune and Paris Commune. The Lyon Commune was established in September 1870 and lasted for roughly eight months, while the Paris Commune was established in March 1871 and crushed by the French Army after two months, with much bloodshed. The original red banners of the Paris Commune became icons of the socialist revolution; in 1921, members of the French Communist Party came to Moscow and presented the new Soviet government with one of the original Commune banners; it remains in place in the tomb of Vladimir Lenin, next to his open coffin.

In the Haymarket affair, during which a bomb blast killed a police officer at a May Day rally for an eight-hour workday in Chicago, anarchists flew red flags. This event, considered to be the beginning of the revival of the international labour movement, is still commemorated annually in many countries as International Workers' Day (though not in the United States).

The red flag gained wide popularity in Russia during the Russian Revolutions of 1917, having been used as a symbol of revolutionary struggle in both the February Revolution and October Revolution; red was the political color of socialists on several opposed sides in the revolutions, such as the Bolsheviks and Socialist Revolutionaries. During the Russian Civil War (1917–1922), a red flag, with a red star symbolising the party and hammer and sickle to symbolise the workers and peasants respectively, became the official flag of Soviet Russia, and, in 1923, of the Soviet Union. It remained so until the dissolution of the Soviet Union in 1991.

During the Chinese Civil War (1927–1949), the flag of the Chinese Communist Party became a red flag with a hammer and sickle, while the flag of the People's Republic of China became a red flag with a large star symbolising the party and four smaller stars symbolising workers, peasants, the urban middle class, and rural middle class, respectively. During the Cold War, many communist states, such as Vietnam, also adopted red flags, while others, such as Cuba, chose to keep their previous flags. Red national flags with symbolism unrelated to socialism have also been adopted; the red flag of Nepal, for instance, represents its national flower.

== Usage ==
=== Anarchism ===
The red flag was one of the first anarchist symbols prior to the Russian Revolution, after which red flags started to be associated with Marxism-Leninism, Bolshevism, and state socialism.

=== Arab world ===
Recent and current Arabian red flags include those of Muscat and Oman, the individual emirates of the United Arab Emirates, the Sheikhdom of Kuwait, Bahrain, and Qatar.

=== China ===
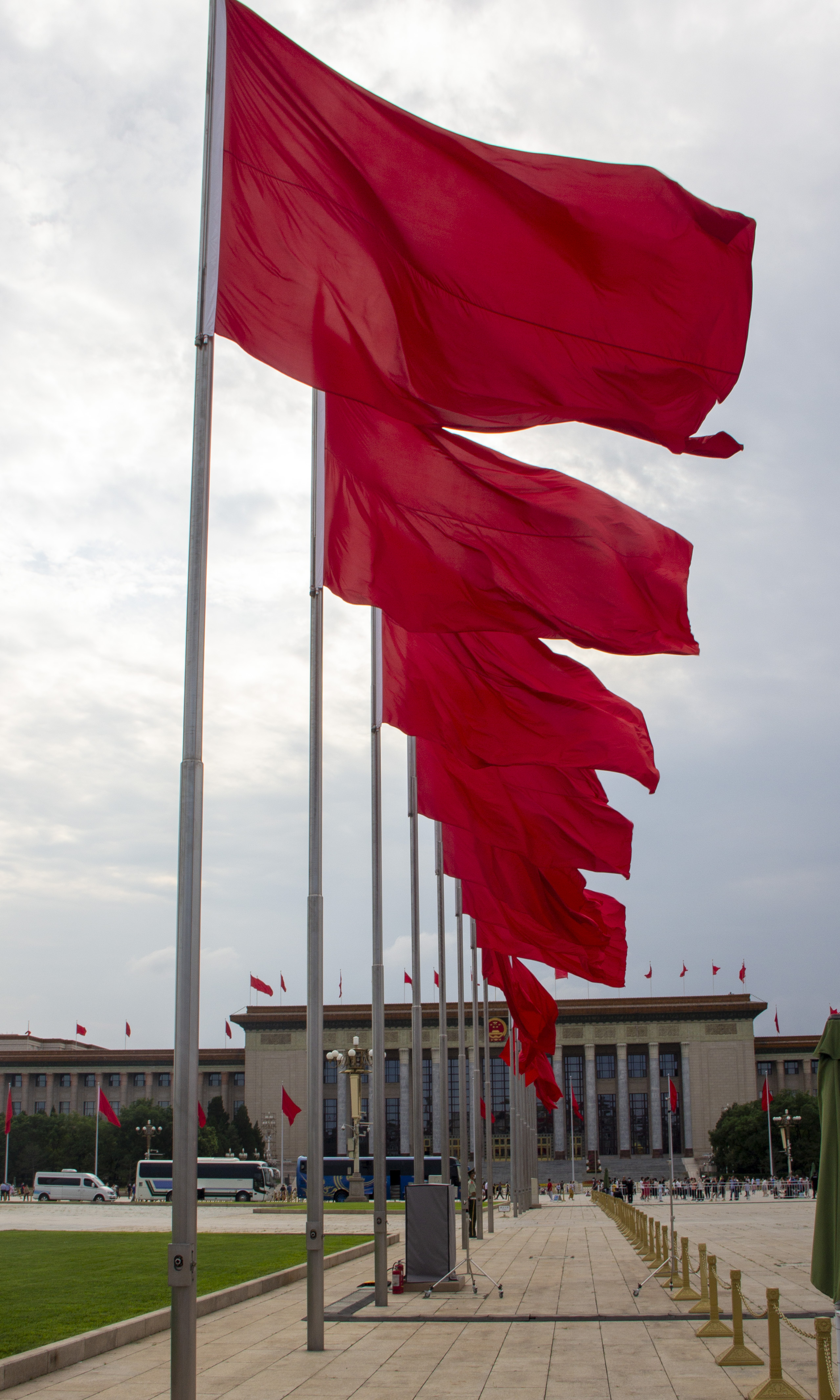
Decorative red flags in Tiananmen Square, in front of the Great Hall of the People.

In China, both the Nationalist Party-led Republic of China and the Communist Party-led People's Republic of China use red fields for their flags, referencing their revolutionary origins. Streets, buildings, businesses and product brands named after the red flag are common in China. For example, a line of limousine cars manufactured by China FAW Group Corporation has the brand name of Red Flag. In 1967 during the Cultural Revolution, Pilal in Akto County, Kizilsu, Xinjiang, China was renamed as Hongqi Commune (红旗公社), meaning 'red flag commune'. In 1968, Baykurut Commune in Ulugqat County, Kizilsu, Xinjiang, China was also renamed as Hongqi Commune.

=== Labour Party (UK) ===
The red flag was the emblem of the British Labour Party from its inception until the Labour Party Conference of 1986 when it was replaced by a red rose, itself a variant of the fist and rose, then in wide use by left of center parties in Western Europe. The more floral red rose design has subsequently been adopted by a number of other socialist and social-democratic parties throughout Western Europe. Members of the party also sing the traditional anthem "The Red Flag" at the conclusion of the annual party conference. In February 2006, "The Red Flag" was sung in Parliament to mark the centenary of the Labour Party's founding. The flag was regularly flown above Sheffield Town Hall on May Day under David Blunkett's Labour administration of Sheffield City Council during the 1980s.

=== Newspapers ===
Various socialist newspapers have used the name The Red Flag.

=== Soviet Union ===
The flag of the Soviet Union, adopted in 1936

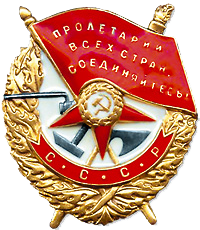
The Order of the Red Banner

In the Soviet Union, the Red Banner (Russian: Красное знамя, Romanized: Krasnoye znamya) was a widely used revolutionary symbol. Military units, institutions, and organizations that were awarded with the Order of the Red Banner, such as the Soviet Army, Soviet Navy, and MVD Internal Troops, were referred to with the honorific title "of the Red Banner" (Russian: Краснознамённый, romanized: Krasnoznamyonny), as in "Red Banner Pacific Fleet", "Guards Red Banner Submarine S-56", or "Twice Red Banner Alexandrov Soviet Army Choir". Civilian establishments that were awarded with the Order of the Red Banner of Labour were also sometimes addressed with the "Red-Banner" honorific.

The Transferable Red Banner (Russian: переходящее Красное знамя) was an award for Soviet collectives in various workplaces that won socialist emulation contests. The term "transferable" means that for a given kind of competition at a given establishment (enterprise, school, institute, clinic, etc.) or category of establishments (e.g., type of industry), a single physical copy of the award was transferred from the winner of one competition to the winner of the next (held annually or quarterly). Any of several levels of the award could have been awarded, depending on the level of the socialist competition: all-Union, union-republican, oblast-wide, industry-wide, enterprise/institution-wide, etc. Similar awards existed in several communist states.

== Historical laws banning red flags ==
After the suppression of the 1848 revolution, red flags and other insignia dominated by the colour red were banned in Prussia, as would later be the case in France after the demise of the Paris Commune. During the persecution of communists and socialists amid the Red Scare of 1919–1920 in the United States, many states passed laws forbidding displays of red flags, including Minnesota, South Dakota, Oklahoma, and California. In Stromberg v. California, the Supreme Court of the United States held that such laws are unconstitutional.

In Australia, red flags were similarly banned in September 1918 under the War Precautions Act 1914. This ban was an arguable cause of the Red Flag riots. The ban ended in Australia with the repeal of the Act in 1920.

== Galleries ==
=== Current flags with socialist and/or communist symbolism ===
Flag of the People's Republic of China; red symbolises revolution, the large star represents the Chinese Communist Party, and the four smaller stars represent the working class, the farmers, and the urban middle class, the rural middle class, respectively, as described by Mao Zedong.

Flag of the Chinese Communist Party, designed in parallelism to the national flag.

Flag of the Socialist Republic of Vietnam; red symbolises revolution, and the five-point star symbolises intellectuals, farmers, workers, traders and soldiers.

Flag of the Communist Party of Vietnam, designed in parallelism to the national flag.

Flag of the Workers' Party of Korea; the hammer represents workers, the sickle represents farmers, and the paint brush represents artisans.

=== Former flags with socialist and/or communist symbolism ===
First flag of the Democratic Republic of Vietnam (1945–1955); predecessor to the modern Vietnamese national flag's design with the exact same symbolism.

Flag of the Democratic Republic of Afghanistan (1978–1980); the socialist-style emblem in the center represented the Khalq faction of the People's Democratic Party of Afghanistan.

Flag of the People's Republic of the Congo (1970–1991); red symbolised revolution, the star represented communism, while the hammer and hoe symbolised workers.

Flag of the Soviet Union (1955–1991); the hammer symbolised workers, the sickle represented farmers, and the red star symbolised the Communist Party.

== See also ==
- Anarchist black flag
- Communist symbolism
- Green flag
- Hongqi ('Red Flag' in Chinese)
- "The Red Flag"
- Red triangle (badge)
- The Standard of Revolt
- White flag

=== Red flags ===
- Flag of Angola
- Flag of Belarus
- Flag of China
- Flag of Kyrgyzstan
- Flag of Mongolia
- Flag of the Soviet Union
- Flag of Vietnam
