= Orient Group =

- Company type: public
- Traded as: SSE: 600811
- Industry: Conglomerate
- Founded: 1978; 48 years ago
- Headquarters: Harbin, Heilongjiang, China
- Area served: China
- Key people: Chairman: Mr. Zhang Hongwei

Chinese name
- Simplified Chinese: 东方集团股份有限公司
- Traditional Chinese: 東方集團股份有限公司
Transcriptions
Standard Mandarin
- Hanyu Pinyin: Dōng fāng jí tuán gǔ fèn yǒu xiàn gōng sī

Chinese short name
- Simplified Chinese: 东方集团
- Traditional Chinese: 東方集團
Transcriptions
- Website: www.china-orient.com

Orient Group Co., Ltd. or Orient Group Inc. is a conglomerate engaged in finance, trading, construction, port, industry, tourism and property development. It is headquartered in Harbin, Heilongjiang, China. It was listed on the Shanghai Stock Exchange in 1994 and it is the first Heilongjiang-based A share listed in Shanghai.
