= Zhejiang Daily Press Group =

State media company in Zhejiang, China

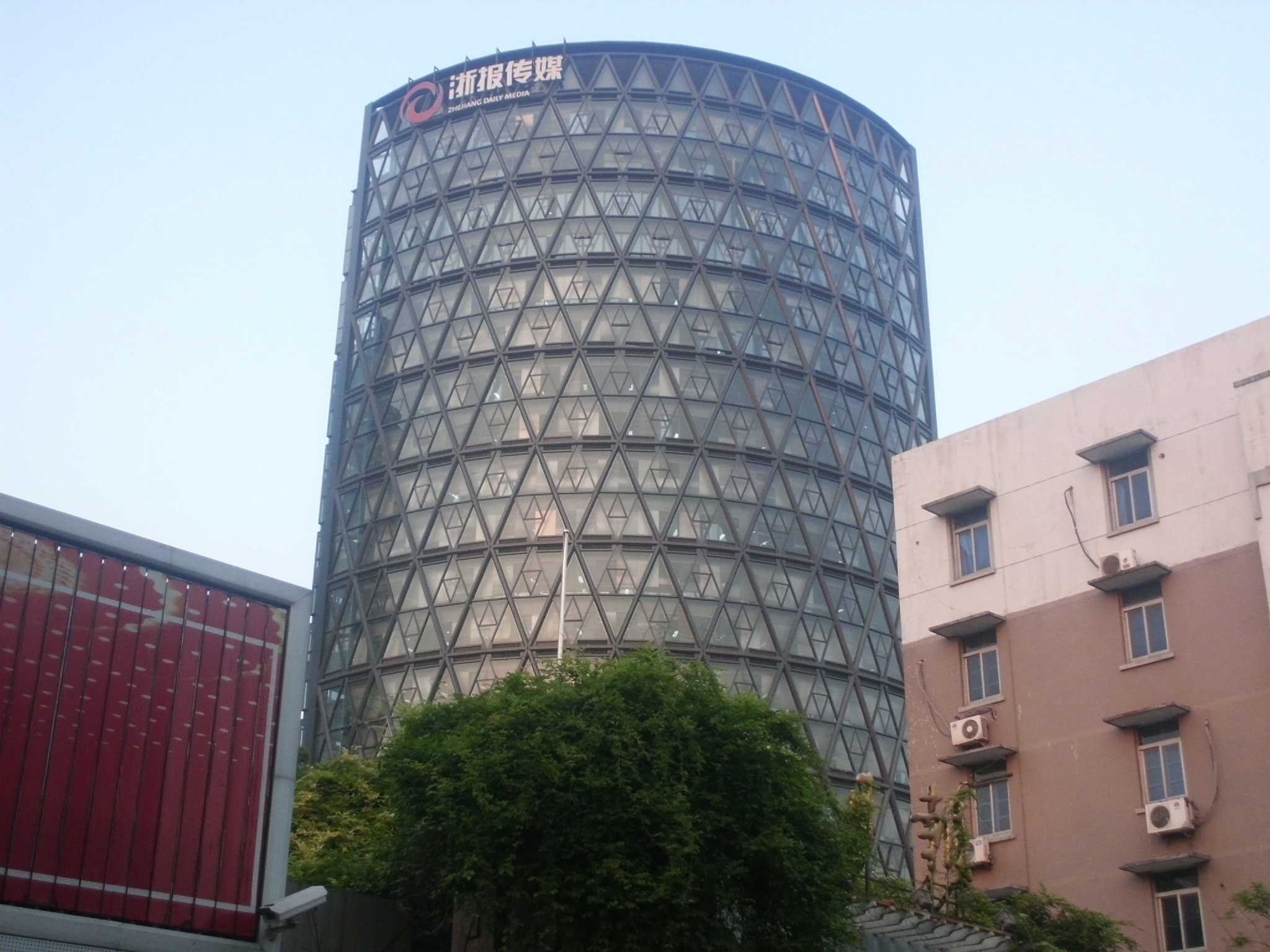
Main Building of Zhejiang Daily Press Group in Hangzhou, Zhejiang, China

Zhejiang Daily Press Group (Chinese: 浙江日报报业集团), abbreviated as ZDPG (Chinese: 浙报传媒), is a newspaper conglomerate in the People's Republic of China, established on June 25, 2000, with ZJNG Media Holding Group incorporated in 2009. The Group currently comprises 33 traditional media outlets, over 300 new media platforms, 5 million traditional media readers, and 660 million registered users (including more than 50 million active users and 30 million mobile users). It encompasses 135 independent legal entities (including over 60 wholly owned and holding subsidiaries) across various sectors such as media, capital operations, real estate, printing, logistics, high technology, and logistics management. The company's flagship publication is the Zhejiang Daily, the official organ of the Zhejiang Provincial Committee of the Chinese Communist Party.

== History ==
In September 2011, Zhejiang Media Group Co., Ltd (SSE: 600633) was publicly listed, marking it as the first listed newspaper group in China and the first publicly traded state-owned cultural firm in Zhejiang Province.

In January 2013, ZheJiang Media Group obtained whole equity interests in Hangzhou Bianfeng and Shanghai Haofang for 3.19 billion yuan. In 2016, ZheJiang Media Group raised 2 billion yuan through a fixed-price scheme for the development of an Internet data center and a large data trading center project. In 2017, Zhejiang Daily Press Group secured 2 billion yuan through the divestiture of its news and media assets to its controlling shareholder, ZJMG Holdings. In the 2016 ranking of national newspaper publishing groups, Zhejiang Daily Press Group secured the second position, trailing only Shanghai United Media Group. In 2018, it ascended to the foremost position.
