= Shuangtaizi District =

Shuangtaizi District 双台子区
- District
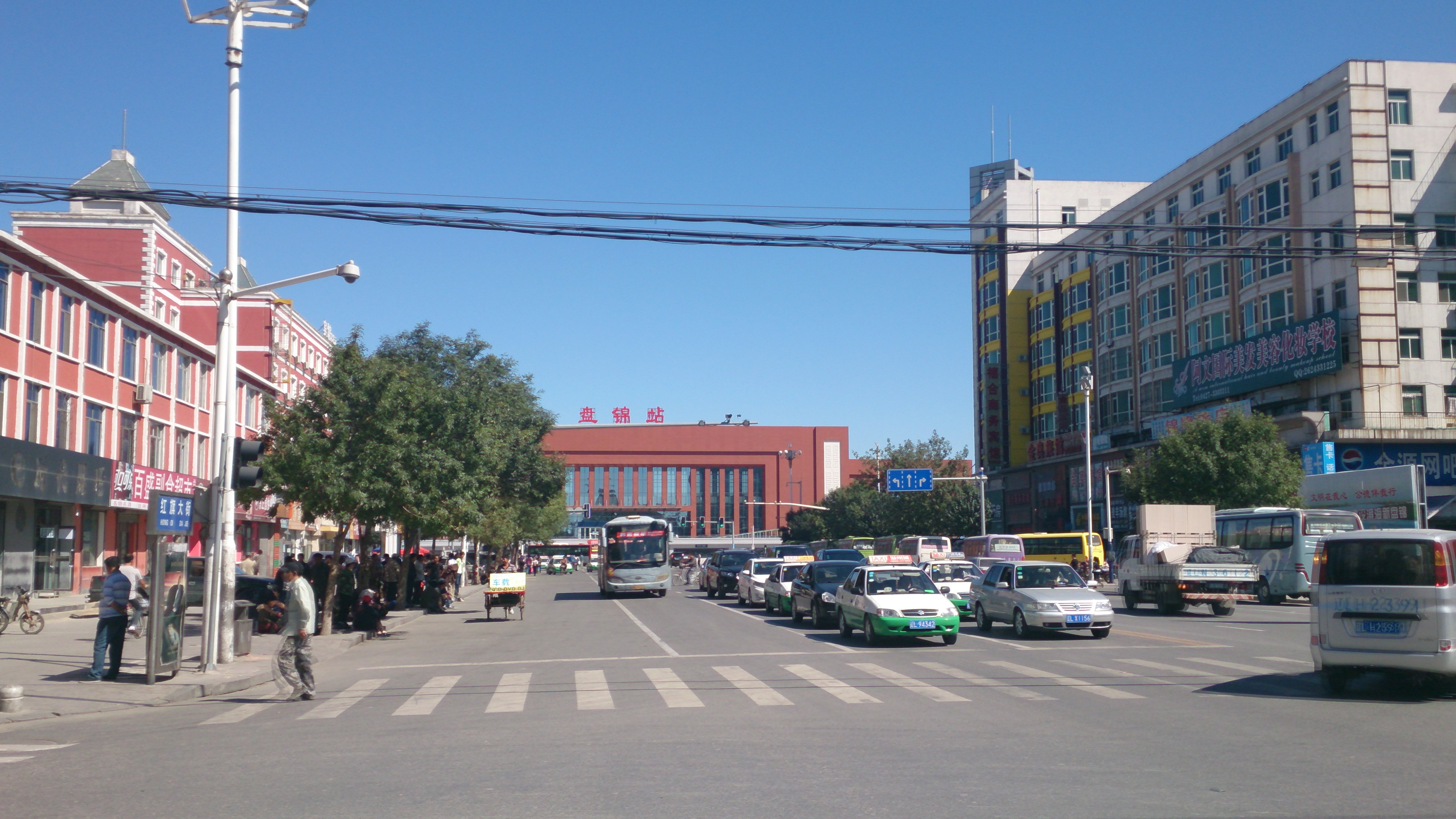

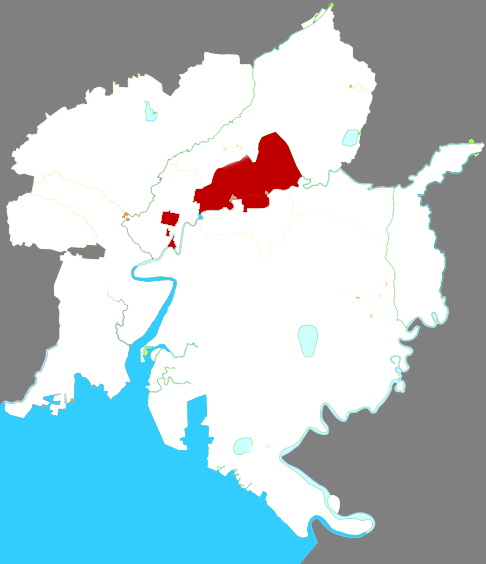
- Shuangtaizi in Panjin

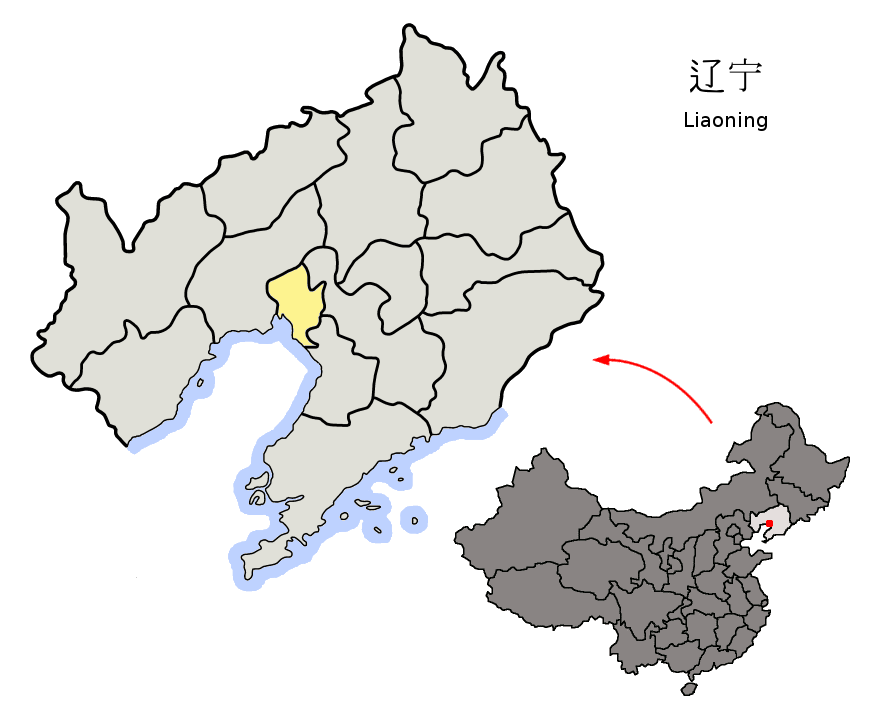
- Panjin in Liaoning
- Coordinates: 41°11′26″N 122°03′36″E
- Country: People's Republic of China
- Province: Liaoning
- Prefecture-level city: Panjin

Area
  - Total: 99.35 km^{2} (38.36 sq mi)

Population (2020 census)
  - Total: 214,290
  - Density: 2,157/km^{2} (5,586/sq mi)
- Time zone: UTC+8 (China Standard)

Shuangtaizi District (simplified Chinese: 双台子区; traditional Chinese: 雙檯子區; pinyin: Shuāngtáizi Qū) is an urban district under the administration of the prefectural city of Panjin in Liaoning province, People's Republic of China. The district's name came from the Shuangtaizi River, the old name (until 2011) of the modern-day lower Liao River, which flows through the southern edge of the district. It has a total area of 99.35 square kilometres (38.36 sq mi), and a population of approximately 200,000 people.

The district's postal code is 124000, and the district government is located at 32 Shengli Street.

== Administrative divisions ==
Shuangtaizi District administers nine subdistricts:

- Dongfeng Subdistrict (东风街道), Shengli Subdistrict (胜利街道), Liaohe Subdistrict (辽河街道), Hongqi Subdistrict (红旗街道), Jianshe Subdistrict (建设街道), Shiyou Subdistrict (石油街道), Huagong Subdistrict (化工街道), Shuangsheng Subdistrict (双盛街道), Tiedong Subdistrict (铁东街道)
