= The Standard of Revolt =

"Le drapeau rouge"
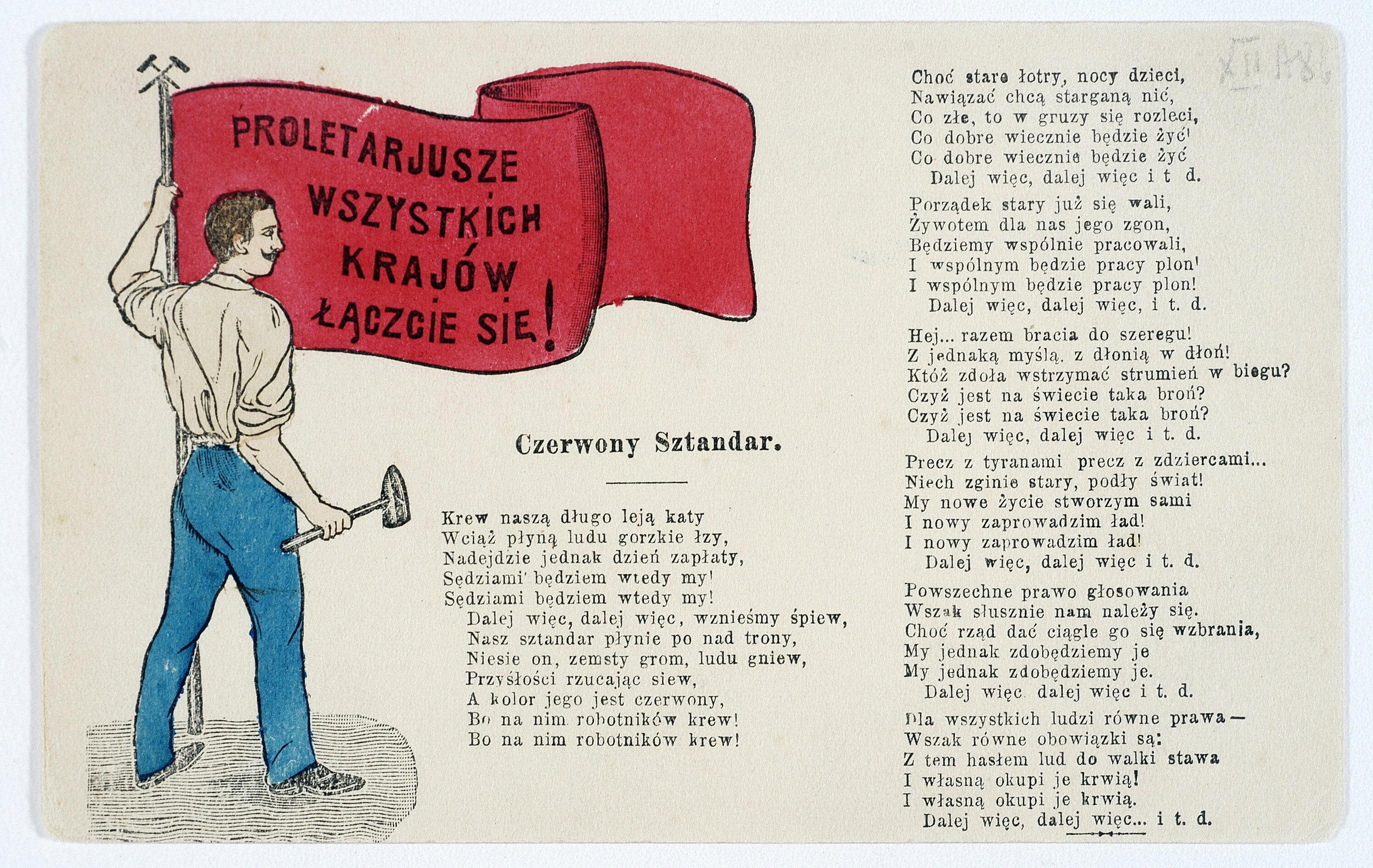

Song
- Language: French
- English title: The Standard of Revolt
- Written: 1877
- Published: 1877
- Genre: revolutionary song
- Songwriters: Paul Brousse (original French); Bolesław Czerwieński (Polish); Michael L. Korr (English)
- Composer: Jacques Vogt

"The Standard of Revolt", known by its original title "The Red Flag" (French: Le drapeau rouge, pronounced [lə dʁapo ʁuʒ]), is a French socialist and anarchist revolutionary song written in 1877 by Paul Brousse to the melody of the Swiss patriotic song "The Shores of Free Sarine" (French: Les bords de la libre Sarine) by Jacques Vogt.

The English translation by M. L. Korr, published in 1932 is not based directly on the original French lyrics, but on the substantially modified Polish 1882 version by Bolesław Czerwieński, titled „Czerwony sztandar“ ("The Red Standard"), which became the anthem of the Polish Socialist Party. Czerwieński's lyrics were also the basis for Czech, German, Hungarian, Latvian, Romanian, Russian, Ukrainian, Yiddish and other translations.

== Lyrics and variants ==
=== French versions ===
Original French lyrics (Paul Brousse, 1877)

Dans la fumée et le désordre,
Parmi les cadavres épars
II était du « parti de l'ordre »
Au massacre du Champ-de-Mars.

Le voilà, le voilà, regardez !
II flotte et, fier, il bouge
Ses longs plis au combat prépares.
Osez le défier
Notre superbe drapeau rouge,
Rouge du sang de l'ouvrier,
Rouge du sang de l'ouvrier.

Mais planté sur les barricades,
Par le peuple de Février,
Lui, le signal des fusillades,
Devient drapeau de l'ouvrier.

Le voilà, le voilà, regardez...

Puis, quand l'ingrate république
Laissa ses fils mourir de faim,
II rentra dans la lutte épique
Le drapeau rouge de Juin.

Le voilà, le voilà, regardez...

Sous la Commune il flotte encore
A la tête des bataillons,
Il chaque barricade arbore
Ses longs Plis taillés en haillons !

Le voilà, le voilà, regardez...

On crut qu'à Berne, en république,
I pouvait passer fièrement ?
Mais, par le sabre despotique,
II fut attaqué lâchement.

Le voilà, le voilà, regardez...

Ce drapeau que le vent balance
Devant un cortège ouvrier,
C'est lui ! glorieux, il s'avance
En triomphe dans St. Imier

Le voilà, le voilà, regardez...

Modified French lyrics (Achille Le Roy, 1885)

Les révoltés du Moyen Âge
L’ont arboré sur maints beffrois.
Emblème éclatant du courage,
Toujours il fit pâlir les rois.

Le voilà, le voilà, regardez !
Il flotte et fièrement il bouge,
Ses longs plis au combat préparés,
Osez, osez le défier,
Notre superbe drapeau rouge,
Rouge du sang de l’ouvrier
Rouge du sang de l’ouvrier.

Dans la fumée et le désordre,
Parmi les cadavres épars
II était du « parti de l'ordre »
Au massacre du Champ-de-Mars.

Le voilà, le voilà, regardez...

Mais planté sur les barricades
Par les héros de Février,
Il devint pour les camarades,
Le drapeau du peuple ouvrier.

Le voilà, le voilà, regardez...

Puis, quand l'ingrate république
Laissa ses fils mourir de faim,
II rentra dans la lutte épique
Le drapeau rouge de Juin.

Le voilà, le voilà, regardez...

Sous la Commune il flotte encore
A la tête des bataillons.
Et chaque barricade arbore
Ses longs plis taillés en haillons.

Le voilà, le voilà, regardez...

Noble étendard du prolétaire,
Des opprimés soit l'éclaireur :
A tous les peuples de la terre
Porte la paix et le bonheur.

Le voilà, le voilà, regardez...

=== Translations ===
Czerwony sztandar (Polish version)

Krew naszą długo leją katy,
Wciąż płyną ludu gorzkie łzy,
Nadejdzie jednak dzień zapłaty,
Sędziami wówczas będziem my!
Sędziami wówczas będziem my!

Dalej więc, dalej więc, wznieśmy śpiew,
Nasz sztandar płynie ponad trony,
Niesie on zemsty grom, ludu gniew,
Przyszłości rzucając siew,
A kolor jego jest czerwony,
Bo na nim robotnicza krew!
Bo na nim robotnicza krew!

Choć stare łotry, nocy dzieci,
Nawiązać chcą starganą nić,
Co złe, to w gruzy się rozleci,
Co dobre, wiecznie będzie żyć!
Co dobre, wiecznie będzie żyć!

Dalej więc, dalej więc, wznieśmy śpiew...

Porządek stary już się wali,
Żywotem dla nas jego zgon,
Będziemy wspólnie pracowali,
I wspólnym będzie pracy plon!
I wspólnym będzie pracy plon!

Dalej więc, dalej więc, wznieśmy śpiew...

Hej, bracia, siostry, do szeregu!
Z jednaką myślą, z dłonią w dłoń!
Któż zdoła strumień wstrzymać w biegu?
Czyż jest na świecie taka broń?
Czyż jest na świecie taka broń?

Dalej więc, dalej więc, wznieśmy śpiew...

Precz z tyranami, ze zdziercami!...
Niech zginie stary, podły świat!
My nowe życie stworzym sami
I nowy zaprowadzim ład!
I nowy zaprowadzim ład!

Dalej więc, dalej więc, wznieśmy śpiew...

Die Rote Fahne (German version)

Des Volkes Blut verströmt in Bächen
Und bittre Tränen rinnen drein
Doch kommt der Tag da wir uns rächen
Dann werden wir die Richter sein,
Dann werden wir die Richter sein.

Stimmet an den Gesang! Nun wohlan!
Die Fahne trägt des Volkes Grollen
Über Zwingburgen stolz himmelan
Morgen der Freiheit, brich an!
Rot ist das Tuch, das wir entrollen,
Klebt doch des Volkes Blut daran,
Klebt doch des Volkes Blut daran.

Wohl knüpft ihr knechtisch finstern
Schergen vergeblich das zerrissne Seil.
Das Schlechte fault in dumpfen Särgen,
Das Gute siegt der Welt zum Heil,
Das Gute siegt der Welt zum Heil.

Stimmet an den Gesang! Nun wohlan...

Schon liegt das Ungetüm im Sterben
Und Leben ist für uns sein Tod
Sein Tod bringt gleiches Recht uns Allen
Und allen Freiheit, allen Brod,
Und allen Freiheit, allen Brod!

Stimmet an den Gesang! Nun wohlan...

Auf Brüder, scharet euch zum Heere
Die Brust von gleichem Geist durchweht
Wo ist die Macht, die einem Meere
Die unsrer Sturmflut widersteht,
Die unsrer Sturmflut widersteht.

Stimmet an den Gesang! Nun wohlan...

Tod euch, den Henkern, den Despoten
Die alte Niedertracht zerfällt
Wir pflügen um den alten Boden
Und bauen eine neue Welt,
Und bauen eine neue Welt.

Stimmet an den Gesang! Nun wohlan...

The Standard of Revolt (English version)

The cruel tyrants of the nation
Have always shed the workers' blood
The people's wrath and indignation
Arises in a mighty flood,
Arises in a mighty flood.

Far and wide spreads the tide of our wrath
We hoist the flag of revolution
It proclaims workers' aims, rebels' path
Tyrants' defeat, retribution
We raise our standard, freedom's banner
Its color is the deepest red
For it the workers' blood was shed

The en'my's brutal rage and fury
Our day of reckoning won't stay
The people will be judge and jury
To try the tyrants of today,
To try the tyrants of today.

Far and wide spreads the tide...

March onward, comrades, into battle
The dawn of liberty is near
No more shall we, like voiceless cattle
Be driven by the goad of fear,
Be driven by the goad of fear.

Far and wide spreads the tide...

Let now the tyrants fret and shudder
The hour approaches of their fall;
The working class will turn the rudder,
Give life and freedom to us all,
Give life and freedom to us all.

Far and wide spreads the tide...
